List of Serbs is a list of notable people who are Serbs or of Serb ancestry. The list includes all notable Serbs sorted by occupation and year of birth, regardless of any political, territorial or other divisions, historical or modern.

Artists

Visual artists

Architects 

 Radovan, 13th century Serbian architect born in Ragusa
 Atanasije Nikolić (1803–1882)
 Andreja Damjanović (1813–1878), 19th century architect from Macedonia, also claimed by Bulgaria
 Emilijan Josimović (1823–1897)
Nikola Djordjević (the 19th century)
Aleksandar Bugarski (1835–1891)
 Svetozar Ivačković (1844–1924), post-Romantic architect
 Konstantin Jovanović (1849–1923), architect who designed National assemblies of Serbia and Bulgaria and National Bank of Serbia
Milan Antonović (1850–1929)
 Milica Krstić Čolak-Antić (1887–1964), one of the most important female architects during the first half of the twenty-first century.
 Vladimir Nikolić (1857–1922)
 Andra Stevanović (1859–1929)
 Dimitrije T. Leko (1864–1914), Serbian architect and urbanist
 Nikola Nestorović (1868–1957)
Danilo Vladisavljević (1871–1923)
 Momčilo Tapavica (1872–1949), designer of Novi Sad's Matica Srpska building; also 1st Serb to win an Olympic medal at 1st modern Olympic Games (Athens, Greece, 1896)
 Petar Popović (1873–1945)
 Petar Bajalović (1876–1947)
 Branko Tanazević (1876–1945)
 Jelisaveta Načić (1876–1955), pioneer in women's architecture in Serbia
 Đura Bajalović (1879–1949)
 Momir Korunović (1883–1969)
 Dragiša Brašovan (1887–1965), modernist architect, leading architect of the early 20th century in Yugoslavia
 Jovanka Bončić-Katerinić (1887–1966), architect, 1st woman engineer in Germany
 Milan Minić (architect) (1889–1961, architect
 Aleksandar Deroko (1894–1988), architect, artist, professor and author
 Nikola Dobrović (1897–1967)
 Milan Zloković (1898–1965), architect, founder of the Group of Architects of Modern Expressions.
 Branislav Kojić (1899–1986) 
 Mihailo Janković (1911–1976), architect who designed several important structures in Serbia
 Milica Šterić (1914–1998), architect for Energoprojekt, built post World War 2 power plants
 Alexis Josic (1921–2011), French architect
 Bogdan Bogdanović (1922–2010), architect, urbanist and essayist, designed monumental concrete sculpture in Jasenovac
 Ivan Antić (1923–2005), architect and academic, considered one of the former Yugoslavia's best post-World War 2 architects
 Ilija Arnautović (1924–2009), Yugoslav and Serbian architect, known for his projects during the period of Serbian and Slovenian socialism (1960–1980)
 Ivanka Raspopović (1930–2015), Serbian architect
 Predrag Ristić (1931–2019), Serbian architect
 Ranko Radović (1935–2005)
 Aleksandar Đokić (1936–2002), architect known for Brutalist and postmodernist styles
 Zoran Bojović (1936–2018), architect for Energoprojekt, worked in Africa
 Zoran Manević (1937–2019), prominent Serbian architecture historian
 Svetlana Kana Radević (1937–2000), architect
 Ljiljana Bakić (1939–2022), Serbian architect
Jovan Prokopljević (born 1940)
 Louis and Dennis Astorino (born 1948), American architects of Serbian origin, Louis was the 1st American architect to design a building in the Vatican
 Ksenija Bulatović (born 1967), architect
 Maja Vidaković Lalić (born 1972), architect
 Dubravka Sekulić (born 1980), architect and academic

Sculptors 

 Petar Ubavkić (1852–1910), recognized as the first sculptor of modern Serbia
 Đorđe Jovanović (1861–1953), won prizes at the World Exhibitions in Paris 1889 and 1900 for the works "Gusle" and "Kosovo Monument"
 Simeon Roksandić (1874–1943), sculptor and academic, highly regarded for his bronzes and fountains (Čukur Fountain), frequently cited as one of the most important figures in Yugoslavian sculpture.
 Dragomir Arambašić (1881–1945)
 Vukosava Velimirović (1888–1965)
 Iva Despić-Simonović (1891–1961)
 Risto Stijović (1894–1974), sculptor, author of Monument to Franchet d'Esperey in Belgrade
 Sreten Stojanović (1898–1960)
 John David Brcin (1899–1983), Serbian American sculptor
 Yevgeny Vuchetich (1908–1974)
 Vojin Bakić (1915–1992), Yugoslav sculptor
 Bogosav Živković (1920–2005)
 Jovan Soldatović (1920–2005)
 Dragiša Stanisavljević (1921–2012)
 Olga Jevrić (1922–2014), awarded sculptor
 Matija Vuković (1925–1985)
 Dušan Džamonja  (1928–2009), sculptor
 Miodrag Živković (1928–2020)
 Slavomir Miletić (born 1930)
 Nebojša Mitrić (1931–1989)
 Mirjana Isaković (born 1936), former professor at Faculty of Applied Arts
 Drinka Radovanović (born 1943), sculptor of many monuments to national heroes
 Slobodan Pejić (1944–2006)
 Lilly Otasevic (born 1969), Serbian born Canadian sculptor/designer
 Mihailo Stošović (born 1971)

Painters, cartoonists, illustrators 

 Lovro Dobričević of Kotor (c. 1420 – 1478), Venetian painter who first started to paint at the Serbian Orthodox Savina Monastery, Montenegro, in the mid-15th century.
 Đorđe Mitrofanović (c. 1550 – 1630), Serbian fresco painter and muralist who travelled and worked throughout the Balkans and the Levant.
 Joakim Marković (c. 1685 – 1757) 
 Hristofor Žefarović (1710–1753)
 Teodor Stefanov Gologlavac (18th century)
 Janko Halkozović (18th century)
 Jovan Četirević Grabovan (1720–1781)
 Jakov Orfelin, (early 18th century–1803)
 Vasa Ostojić, (1730–1791)
 Teodor Kračun (1730–1781)
 Dimitrije Bačević (1735–1770)
 Nikola Nešković (1740–1789)
 Lazar Serdanović, (1744–1799)
 Simeon Lazović (c. 1745 – 1817)
 Teodor Ilić Češljar (1746–1793)
 Stefan Gavrilović (c. 1750 – 1823)
 Jovan Pačić (1771–1849)
 Pavel Đurković (1772–1830)
 Aleksije Lazović (1774–1873)
 Petar Nikolajević Moler (1775–1816), revolutionary and painter
 Georgije Bakalović (1786–1843), Serbian painter
 Konstantin Danil (1798–1873), painter and portraitist of the 19th century
 Grigorije Davidović-Obšić, (18th century)
 Uroš Knežević (1811–1876)
 Katarina Ivanović (1811–1882)
 Dimitrije Avramović (1815–1855), painter known best for his iconostasis and frescos.
 Pavel Petrović (1818–1887)
 Pavel Đurković (early 19th century)
 Novak Radonić (1826–1890)
 Mina Karadžić (1828–1894)
 Đura Jakšić (1832–1878)
 Ladislav Eugen Petrovits (1839–1907)
 Đorđe Krstić (1851–1907)
 Uroš Predić (1857–1923)
 Paja Jovanović (1859–1957)
 Anastas Bocarić (1864–1944)
 Marko Murat (1864–1944)
 Dragutin Inkiostri Medenjak (1866–1942), painter and is also considered the first interior designer in Serbia.
 Jovan Pešić (1866–1936)
 Beta Vukanović (1872–1972)
 Rista Vukanović (1873–1918)
 Nadežda Petrović (1873–1915)
 Stevan Aleksić (1876–1923)
 Veljko Stanojević (1878–1977)
 Branko Popović (1882–1944)
 Todor Švrakić (1882–1931)
 Ljubomir Ivanović (1882–1945)
 Lazar Drljača (1882–1970)
 Jovan Bijelić (1886–1964)
 Alexander Sambugnac (1888–1960)
 Petar Dobrović (1890–1942)
 Vasa Pomorišac (1893–1961)
 Risto Stijović (1894–1974)
 Zora Petrović (1894–1962)
 Ilija Bašičević (1895–1972)
 Ignjat Job (1895–1936)
 Sava Šumanović (1896–1942)
 Mladen Josić (1897–1972)
 Milo Milunović (1897–1967)
 Milan Konjović (1898–1993)
 Ivan Tabaković (1898–1977)
 Živko Stojsavljević (1900–1978)
 Dragan Aleksić (1901–1958), Yugoslav dadaist painter, founder of Yugo-Dada
 Mihajlo Petrov (1902–1983)
 Marko Čelebonović (1902–1986), artist
 Đorđe Andrejević Kun (1904–1964) Serbian and Yugoslavian painter, designer of the Belgrade Coat of Arms and reputedly designed the Coat of arms of Yugoslavia and Yugoslav orders and medals
 Janko Brašić (1906–1994), one of the foremost contributors to the naive art genre
 Petar Lubarda (1907–1974)
 Predrag Milosavljević (1908–1989)
 Milena Pavlović-Barili (1909–1945)
 Ljubica Sokić (1914–2009)
 Miodrag B. Protić (1922–2014)
 Ljubinka Jovanović (1922–2015)
 Milorad Bata Mihailović (1923–2011)
 Mića Popović (1923–1996)
 Mića Popović (1923–1996)
 Kossa Bokchan (1925–2009)
 Sava Stojkov (1925–2014)
 Mladen Srbinović (1925–2009)
 Petar Omčikus (1926–2019)
 Ljubomir Pavićević Fis (1927–2015), graphic- and industrial designer, According to the Belgrade Museum of Applied Arts, "Serbia's oldest and most well-known designer".
 Draginja Vlasic (1928–2011), painter
 Radomir Stević Ras (1931–1982)
 Olja Ivanjicki (1931–2009), contemporary artist in fields such as sculpture, poetry, costume design, architecture and writing, but was best known for her painting.
 Jelena Patrnogic (1932–2010)
 Predrag Koraksić Corax (born 1933), political caricaturist
 Ljuba Popović (1934–2016)
 Milić od Mačve (1934–2000)
 Vladislav Lalicki (1935–2008)
 Vladimir Veličković (1935–2019)
 Radomir Damnjanović Damnjan (born 1935)
 Bratsa Bonifacho (born 1937)
 Djordje Prudnikov (1939–2017)
 Dušan Otašević (born 1940)
 Stevan Knežević (1940–1995)
 Dušan Petričić (born 1946), illustrator and caricaturist (Toronto Star, New York Times)
 Dragan Malešević Tapi (1949–2002)
 Jugoslav Vlahović (born 1949), illustrator, known for many Yugoslav album covers
 Relja Penezic (born 1950)
 Branislav Kerac (born 1952), comics artist, he created Cat Claw
 Rastko Ćirić (born 1955)
 Gradimir Smudja (born 1956), cartoonist in France and Italy, published acclaimed "Le Cabaret des Muses"
 Mile V. Pajić (born 1958)
 Milica Tomić (born 1960)
 Zoran Janjetov (born 1961), comics artist, worked with Alejandro Jodorowsky
 Slobodan Peladić (1962–2019)
 Aleksandar Zograf (born 1963), cartoonist
 Uroš Đurić (born 1964)
 Gradimir Smudja (born 1965)
 Petar Meseldžija (born 1965)
 Jasmina Đokić (born 1970)
 Viktor Mitic (born 1970)
 Irena Kazazić (born 1972), Slovenian painter of Serbian origin
 Aleksa Gajić (born 1974), comics artist

Performance artists 

 Marina Abramović (born 1946), performance artist 
 Ana Prvacki (born 1976), performance and installation artist

Photographers 

 Anastas Jovanović (1817–1899), first professional photographer of Serbia
 Milan Jovanović (1863–1944), Serbian photographer.
 Branibor Debeljković) (1916–2003), the first photographer member of ULUS (Serbian Association of Artists)
 Stevan Kragujević (1922–2002), photojournalist and art photographer
 Boris Spremo (1935–2017), Serbian-born Canadian award-winning photojournalist, member of the Order of Canada
 Zoran Đorđević (born 1959), press photographer and film lecturer
 Dragan Tanasijević (born 1959), portrait photographer
 Željko Jovanović (born 1961), press photographer
 Srdjan Ilic (born 1966), award-winning press photographer
 Boogie (Vladimir Milivojevich) (born 1969), Serbian-born American documentary photographer
 Goran Tomasevic (born 1969), award-winning press photographer for Reuters
 Milena Rakocević, fashion photographer

Musicians

Composers 

 Kir Joakim (14th and early 15th century)
 Kir Stefan the Serb (14th and early 15th century)
 Nikola the Serb (14th and early 15th century)
 Isaiah the Serb (14th and early 15th century)
 Pajsije (1542–1647), the Serbian Patriarch from 1614 to 1647, he also composed chants
 Josip Runjanin, (1821–1878), Croatian and Serbian composer, ethnic Serb.
 Kornelije Stanković (1831–1865)
 Slavka Atanasijević (1850–1897), Serbian composer and pianist.
 Josif Marinković (1851–1923), one of the most important Serbian composers of the 19th century.
 Stevan Stojanović Mokranjac (1856–1914)
 Jovo Ivanišević (1861–1889)
 Stanislav Binički (1872–1942)
 Marko Nešić (1873–1938) 
 Petar Krstić (1877–1957)
 Petar Stojanović (1877–1957)
 Isidor Bajić (1878–1918)
 Petar Konjović (1883–1970)
 Miloje Milojević (1884–1946)
 Stevan Hristić (1885–1958)
 Rudolph Reti (1885–1957)
 Mihailo Vukdragović (1900–1967)
 Marko Tajčević (1900–1984)
 Ljubica Marić (1909–2003)
 Dragutin Gostuški (1923–1998)
 Vasilije Mokranjac (1923–1984)
 Dusan Trbojevic (1925–2011)
 Aleksandar Obradović (1927–2001)
 Dejan Despić (born 1930)
 Voki Kostić (1931–2010)
 Zoran Sztevanovity (born 1942)
 Milan Mihajlović (born 1945)
 Zoran Simjanović (1946–2021)
 Dušan Šestić (born 1946), composer of the National anthem of Bosnia and Herzegovina
 Vojna Nešić (born 1947)
 Vladimir Tošić (born 1949)
 Zoran Erić (born 1950)
 Goran Bregović (born 1950), Yugoslav and Bosnian composer
 Dušan Bogdanović (born 1955)
 Miloš Raičković (born 1956)
 Vladimir Graić (born 1967)
 Isidora Žebeljan (1967–2020)
 Ana Sokolovic (born 1968), Serbian born Canadian music composer
 Aleksandra Vrebalov (born 1970), Serbian – American composer 
 Aleksandar Kobac (born 1971)
 Kornelije Kovač (born 1942)
 Aleksandra Kovač (born 1972)
 Kristina Kovač (born 1974)
 Jasna Veličković (born 1974)

Opera singers 

 Miroslav Čangalović (1921–1999)
 Radmila Bakočević (born 1933), spinto soprano
 Olivera Miljaković (born 1934)
 Milka Stojanović (born 1937)
 Radmila Smiljanić (born 1940), classical soprano who has had an active international career in operas and concerts since 1965. She is particularly known for her portrayals of heroines from the operas of Giuseppe Verdi and Giacomo Puccini.
 Oliver Njego (born 1959), baritone, student of Bakočević, who also crossed over into popular music, eventually becoming a prominent opera singer.
 Dragana Jugović del Monaco (born 1963)
 Laura Pavlović, lyric and spinto soprano opera singer, and a soloist with the Serbian National Theatre Opera in Novi Sad.
 Milena Kitic (born 1968), Serbian-born American mezzo-soprano
 Željko Lučić (born 1968), Serbian operatic baritone
 Suzana Šuvaković Savić (1969–2016)
 Nikola Mijailović (born 1973), baritone
 David Bižić (born 1975), baritone

Music performers 

 Filip Višnjić (1767–1834), guslar
 Djuro Milutinović the Blind (1774–1844), guslar
 Petar Perunović-Perun (1880–1952), Montenegrin Serb, naturalized U.S., guslar
 Vlastimir Pavlović Carevac (1895–1965), Serbian violinist, conductor and founder and director of the National Orchestra of Radio Belgrade
 Jovan Šajnović (1924–2004)
 Mihailo Živanović (1928–1989), clarinetist, saxophonist and composer
 Milenko Stefanović (1930–2022), classical and jazz clarinettist
 Duško Gojković (born 1931), jazz trumpetist and composer
Boki Milošević (1931–2018)
 Del Casher (born 1938), American musician and inventor
 Muruga Booker (born Steven Bookvich, 1942), drummer, composer, recording artist
 Brian Linehan (1944–2004), host-producer of TV's City Lights
 Bora Dugić (born 1945), flautist
 Alex Lifeson (born Aleksandar Živojinović, 1953), Guitarist for the legendary rock band Rush
 Lene Lovich (born 1949), New Wave singer-songwriter, musician
 Raša Đelmaš (born 1950), rock drummer
 Philippe Djokic (born 1950), professor of violin at Dalhousie University
 Radomir Mihailović Točak (born 1950), rock, jazz, blues guitarist
 Laza Ristovski (1956–2007), rock/jazz keyboard player
 Miroslav Tadić (born 1956), classical guitarist
 Milan Mladenović (1958–1994), singer, guitar player
 Uroš Dojčinović (born 1959), guitarist
 Dragomir Mihajlović (born 1960), guitarist
 Zoran Lesandrić (born 1961), rock musician
 Boban Marković (born 1964), acclaimed brass ensemble leader (Boban Marković Orchestra), won "Best Orchestra" at 40th Guča Sabor (2000)
Igor Paspalj the Best Guitarist in the World for 2020 | The Srpska Times
Your Electric Guitarist of the Year 2020 winner is Igor Paspalj
 Sanja Stijačić (born 1965)
 Bojan Zulfikarpašić (born 1968), pianist
 Mike Dimkich (born 1968), Punk guitarist (The Cult & Bad Religion)
 Marina Arsenijevic (born 1970), concert pianist and composer
 Marija Gluvakov (born 1973)
 Ana Popović (born 1976), blues guitarist
 Stefan Milenković (born 1977), violin player
 Slobodan Trkulja (born 1977), multi-instrumentalist
 Kornelije Kovač (born 1978), rock keyboard player and composer
 Miloš Mihajlović (born 1978)
 Milaan (born 1979), accordionist
 Jasna Popovic (born 1979), pianist
 Denise Djokic (born 1980), Canadian cellist
 Maja Bogdanović (born 1982), cellist
 Ivy Jenkins (born Ivana Vujic, 1983), metal bass player, fashion designer
 Nemanja Radulović (born 1985), violinist
 Jelena Mihailović (born 1987), cellist
 Marija Šestić (born 1987)
Dejan Bogdanović
Tatjana Olujić

Singers 

 Nada Mamula (1927–2001), traditional folk singer
 Đorđe Marjanović (1931–2021)
 Bora Spužić Kvaka (1934–2002), singer
 Lola Novaković (1935–2016), pop singer
 Predrag Živković Tozovac (1936–2021)
 Arsen Dedić (1938–2015), chanson singer
 Toma Zdravković (1938–1991)
 Lepa Lukić (born 1940), folk singer
 Boba Stefanović (1946–2015)
 Dušan Prelević (1948–2007, singer, journalist, and writer
 Miroslav Ilić (born 1950), folk singer
 Miloš Bojanić (born 1950), folk singer
 Šaban Šaulić (1951–2019), folk singer-songwriter
 Zdravko Čolić (born 1951), pop singer
 Bora Đorđević (born 1953), rock musician, member of Riblja Čorba
 Đorđe Balašević (born 1953), pop-rock musician
 Slađana Milošević (born 1955), rock musician
 Željko Samardžić (born 1955), pop singer
 Zorica Brunclik (born 1955), folk singer
 Vesna Zmijanac (born 1957), pop-folk singer
 Mitar Mirić (born 1957), folk singer
 Goran Šepa (born 1958), musician best known as the frontman of Kerber
 Lepi Mića (born 1959), singer
 Ana Bekuta (born 1959)
 Snežana Đurišić (born 1959)
 Momčilo Bajagić "Bajaga" (born 1960), rock musician, member of Bajaga i Instruktori
 Bebi Dol (born 1962), pop, rock and jazz singer-songwriter
 Nele Karajlić (born 1962), rock musician, member of Zabranjeno Pušenje
 Baja Mali Knindža (born 1966), singer
 Aca Lukas (born 1968), pop-folk musician
 Dragana Mirković (born 1968), pop-folk singer
 Divna Ljubojević (born 1970), singer
 Svetlana Spajić (born 1971), world music singer-songwriter
 Aleksandra Kovač (born 1972), pop and R&B singer-songwriter, member of K2
 Željko Joksimović (born 1972), pop singer, 2nd place at Eurovision 2004, and 3rd place at Eurovision 2012
 Aco Pejović (born 1972)
 Ceca (born 1973), pop-folk singer
 Dalibor Andonov Gru (1973–2019), rapper
 Aleksandra Radović (born 1974), pop and R&B singer
 Viki Miljković (born 1974)
 Goca Tržan (born 1974), Europop singer, member of Tap 011
 Kristina Kovač (born 1974), pop and R&B singer-songwriter, member of K2
 Vlado Georgiev (born 1976), pop-rock musician
 Jelena Karleuša (born 1978), pop singer
 Nataša Bekvalac (born 1980), pop singer
 Saša Matić (born 1978), pop-folk musician
 Seka Aleksić (born 1981), pop-folk singer
 Marija Šerifović (born 1984), pop singer, winner of the Eurovision 2007
 Bojana Vunturišević (born 1985), singer-songwriter
 Milan Stanković (born 1987), pop singer
 Stefan Đurić Rasta (born 1989), rapper
 Danica Crnogorčević (born 1993), religious songs singer
 Barbara Pravi (born 1993), French singer

Performing artists

Actors 

 John Malkovich
 Toša Jovanović (1845–1893)
 Milorad Petrović (1865–1928)
 Dobrica Milutinović (1880–1956)
 Žanka Stokić (1887–1947)
 Iván Petrovich (1894–1962) German actor of Serbian origin, silent screen star
 Ljubinka Bobić (1897–1978)
 Milivoje Živanović (1900–1976)
 Nevenka Urbanova (1909–2007), actress
 Gloria Grey (1909–1947), American silent film star
 John Miljan (1897–1960)
 Rahela Ferari (1911–1994)
 Karl Malden (1912–2009), Academy award-winning actor
 John Vivyan (1915–1983), born as John R. Vukayan; film, stage and television actor ("Mr. Lucky", a popular CBS adventure series), also a highly decorated veteran
 Brad Dexter (1917–2002), actor in Hollywood classics 
 Rade Marković (1921–2010)
 Michel Auclair (1922–1988)
 Olga Spiridonović (1923–1994)
 Mija Aleksić (1923–1995)
 Mira Stupica (1923–2016)
 Mihajlo Bata Paskaljević (1923–2004)
 Miodrag Petrović Čkalja (1924–2003)
 Olivera Marković (1925–2011), actress
 Radmila Savićević (1926–2001)
 Branko Pleša (1926–2001)
 Pavle Vujisić (1926–1988)
 Stevo Žigon (1926–2005)
 Pavle Vujisić (1926–1988)
 Vlasta Velisavljević (1926–2021)
 Živojin Milenković (1928–2008)
 Ljuba Tadić (1929–2005)
 Vlastimir Đuza Stojiljković (1929–2015)
 Mira Banjac (born 1929)
 Renata Ulmanski (born 1929)
 Stevan Šalajić (1929–2002)
 Bora Todorović (1929–2014)
 Predrag Laković (1929–1997)
 Stole Aranđelović (1930–1993)
 Nadja Regin (1931–2019), Serbian actress, part of the crew of From Russia with Love
 Đoko Rosić (1932–2014)
 Dragomir Gidra Bojanić (1933–1993)
 Velimir Bata Živojinović (1933–2016)
 Jelena Žigon (1933–2018)
 Predrag Milinković (1933–1998)
 Dragomir Bojanić (1933–1993)
 Danilo Stojković (1934–2002)
 Taško Načić, (1934–1993)
 Ružica Sokić (1934–2013)
 Slobodan Aligrudić (1934–1985)
 Nikola Simić (1934–2014)
 Milena Vukotic (born 1935), Italian film actress
 Zoran Rankić (1935–2019)
 Ljubiša Samardžić (1936–2017)
 Ljubomir Ćipranić (1936–2010)
 Rada Rassimov (born 1938), Italian actress, best known for her role in The Good, the Bad and the Ugly
 Ivan Rassimov (1938–2003)
 Vera Čukić (born 1938)
 Mihailo Janketić (1938–2019)
 Zoran Bečić (1939–2006)
 Miloš Žutić (1939–1993)
 Gojko Mitić (born 1940)
 Olivera Katarina (born 1940)
 Milena Dravić (1940–2018)
 Neda Spasojević (1941–1981)
 Petar Kralj (1941–2011)
 Vladan Živković (born 1941)
 Mel Novak (born 1942)
 Seka Sablić (born 1942)
 Beba Lončar (born 1943), Serbian-Italian film actress
 Dragan Nikolić (1943–2016)
 Snežana Nikšić (born 1943)
 Dušica Žegarac (1944–2019)
 Boro Stjepanović (born 1946)
 Predrag Ejdus (1947–2018)
 Josif Tatić (1946–2013)
 Marko Nikolić (1946–2019)
 Milan Gutović (born 1946)
 Rade Šerbedžija (born 1946)
 Sasha Montenegro (born 1946)
 Petar Božović (born 1946)
 Branko Cvejić (born 1946)
 Miroljub Lešo (1946–2019)
 Branko Milićević (born 1946)
 Svetlana Bojković (born 1947)
 Stole Aranđelović (1949–2001)
 Vojislav Brajović (born 1949)
 Miodrag Krivokapić (born 1949)
 Dragan Maksimović (1949–2001)
 Miki Manojlović (born 1950), Yugoslav and Serbian actor, star of some of the most important films in Yugoslav cinema, president of the Serbian Film Center since 2009
 Natalia Nogulich (born 1950), American actress (Performed in Star Trek: The Next Generation)
 Aleksandar Berček (born 1950)
 Danilo Lazović (1951–2006)
 Lazar Ristovski (born 1952), actor and director
 Gorica Popović (born 1952)
 Predrag Miletić (born 1952)
 Tanja Bošković (born 1953)
 Bogdan Diklić (born 1953)
 Radmila Živković (born 1953)
 Radoš Bajić (born 1953)
 Neda Arnerić (1953–2020)
 Vesna Čipčić (born 1954)
 Jelica Sretenović (born 1954)
 Zlata Petković (1954–2012)
 Ljiljana Blagojević (born 1955)
 Mima Karadžić (born 1955)
 Milenko Zablaćanski (1955–2008)
 Branislav Lečić (born 1955)
 Mirjana Karanović (born 1957)
 Boris Komnenić (1957–2021)
 Olga Odanović (born 1958)
 Zoran Cvijanović (born 1958)
 Radoslav Milenković (born 1958)
 Branimir Brstina (born 1960)
 Tihomir Stanić (born 1960)
 Žarko Laušević (born 1960)
 Svetislav Goncić (born 1960)
 Lolita Davidovich (born 1961), American actress, True Detective
 Catharine Oxenberg (born 1961), American TV actress (Serbian mother Princess Elisabeth of Yugoslavia)
 Sonja Savić (1961–2008)
 Milorad Mandić (1961–2016)
 Dubravko Jovanović (born 1961)
 Predrag Bjelac (born 1962)
 Slavko Labović (born 1962)
 Dragoljub Ljubičić (born 1962)
 Anica Dobra (born 1963), Serbian actress, who won Bavarian Film Awards "Best Young Actress" for Rosamunde, cast in German Love Scenes from Planet Earth
 Dragan Bjelogrlić (born 1963)
 Branka Pujić (born 1963)
 Srđan Žika Todorović (born 1965)
 Slobodan Ninković (born 1965)
 Dragan Jovanović (born 1965)
 Marko Todorović (born 1965)
 Vesna Trivalić (born 1965)
 Dejan Čukić (born 1966)
 Nikola Pejaković (born 1966)
 Boris Isaković (born 1966)
 Jasna Đuričić (born 1966)
 Nikola Kojo (born 1967)
 Mirjana Joković (born 1967)
 Anita Mančić (born 1968)
 Dubravka Mijatović (born 1968)
 Nebojša Glogovac (1969–2018)
 Dragan Mićanović (born 1970)
 Branka Katić (born 1970)
 Goran Kostić (born 1971)
 Vojin Ćetković (born 1971)
 Boris Milivojević (born 1971)
 Nenad Jezdić (born 1972)
 Nataša Ninković (born 1972)
 Katarina Žutić (born 1972)
 Sergej Trifunović (born 1972)
 Vjera Mujović (born 1972)
 Sasha Alexander (born 1973), Hollywood actress (Dawson's Creek, Rizzoli and Isles), daughter-in-law of Sophia Loren
 Adrienne Janic (born 1974)
 Nikola Đuričko (born 1974)
 Miloš Samolov (born 1974)
 Miloš Timotijević (born 1975)
 Milla Jovovich (born 1975)
 Nataša Tapušković (born 1975)
 Ben Mulroney (born 1976)
 Ljubomir Bandović (born 1976)
 Ursula Yovich (born 1977), Australian actress of Serbian-Aboriginal origin
 Gordan Kičić (born 1977)
 Branislav Trifunović (born 1978)
 Andrija Milošević (born 1978)
 Marinko Madžgalj (1978–2016)
 Stefan Kapičić (born 1978)
 Stana Katić (born 1978), Canadian born Hollywood actress, featured in TV series Castle
 Vuk Kostić (born 1979)
 Ivan Bosiljčić (born 1979)
 Branko Tomović (born 1980)
 Sonja Kolačarić (born 1980)
 Sarah Sokolovic (born 1980)
 Sloboda Mićalović (born 1981)
 Bojana Novakovic (born 1981)
 Marija Karan (born 1982)
 Holly Valance (born 1983), Australian actress and singer, Serbian father
 Petar Benčina (born 1984), actor
 Danica Curcic (born 1985), Danish actress, Serbian parentage
 Nataša Petrović (born 1988)
 Miloš Biković (born 1988)
 Nataša Petrović (born 1988)
 Jelisaveta Orašanin (born 1988)
 Tamara Dragičević (born 1989)
 Mirka Vasiljević (born 1992)
 Olympia Valance (born 1993), Australian actress and model, Serbian father

Film/TV directors and screenwriters 

 Svetozar Botorić (1857–1916), owner of Serbia's first movie theatre, the Paris Cinema
 Slavko Vorkapić (1894–1976), director and editor
 Ognjenka Milićević (1927–2008)
 Aleksandar Petrović (1929–1994), film director
 Dušan Makavejev (1932–2019), film director and screenwriter.
 Đorđe Kadijević (born 1933), film and TV director
 Boro Drašković (born 1935), director
 Gordan Mihić (1938–2019)
 Peter Bogdanovich (born 1939), director
 Gojko Mitić (born 1940), director
 Steve Tesich (1942–1996), Oscar-winning screenwriter and playwright
 Želimir Žilnik (born 1942), director, Golden Bear winner at the Berlin International Film Festival
 Slobodan Pavićević (born 1945), film and TV production manager and producer
 Slobodan Šijan (born 1946), director
 Goran Paskaljević (born 1947), director
 Dušan Kovačević (born 1948), director and writer
 Božidar Zečević (born 1948), film historian and critic
 Nebojša Pajkić (born 1951)
 Emir Kusturica (born 1954), filmmaker, actor, writer and musician
 Predrag Bambić (born 1958), film and television cinematographer and producer
 Dragoslav Bokan (born 1961)
 Goran Gajić (born 1962), director
 Srđan Dragojević (born 1963), director
 Ivan Šijak (born 1969), director
 Sven Stojanovic (born 1969), Swedish TV director
 Đorđe Milosavljević (born 1969)
 Srdan Golubović (born 1972), director
 Stefan Arsenijević (born 1977), director, Golden Bear winner at the Berlin International Film Festival
 Michael Jelenic (born 1977)
 Mila Turajlić (born 1979), documentary filmmaker
 Boris Malagurski (born 1988), documentary filmmaker
 Dušan Lazarević

Designers 

 Jelena Patrnogic (1932–2010), costume designer
 Zoran Ladicorbic (born 1947), Serbian-born American fashion designer
 Verica Rakocević (born 1948), fashion designer
 Miljen Kljaković (born 1950), award-winning production designer
 Sacha Lakic (born 1964), Serbian-born French automotive and furniture designer
 Konstantin Grcic (born 1965), industrial designer
 Jelena Behrend (born 1968), Serbian-born American jewelry designer
 Marek Djordjevic (born 1969), automobile designer
 Marijana Matthäus (born 1971), Serbian fashion designer
 Elena Karaman Karić (born 1971), interior designer, furniture designer
 Aleksandar Protić (born 1973), fashion designer
 Ana Šekularac (born 1974), British fashion designer of Serbian descent
 Boris Nikolić (1974–2008), fashion designer
 Roksanda Ilincic (born 1975), Serbian-born British fashion designer
 Zvonko Marković (born 1975), fashion designer
 Gorjana Reidel (born 1978), Serbian-born American jewelry designer
 Ivana Sert (born 1979), swimsuit designer, television presenter, model
 Bojana Sentaler, Serbian-born Canadian fashion designer
 Bata Spasojević, fashion designer
 Ines Janković (born 1983), fashion designer
 Ana Kras (born 1984), Serbian-born American fashion and furniture designer, photographer
 Ana Ljubinković (born 1985), fashion designer
 Mihailo Anušić (born 1985), fashion designer
 Sonja Jocić (born 1988), fashion designer
 Nevena Ivanović (born 1992), fashion designer
 George Styler, Serbian-born American fashion designer
 Rushka Bergman, Serbian-born American fashion stylist and editor
 Jovan Jelovac, founder and director of Belgrade Design Week
 Ivana Pilja, fashion designer
 Ana Rajcevic, fashion artist
 Aleksandra Lalić, fashion designer
 Evica Milovanov-Penezic, glove designer

Models 

 Zlata Petković (1954–2012)
 Aleksandra Melnichenko (born 1977), Serbian model and pop group member, wife of Andrey Melnichenko
 Nataša Vojnović (born 1979), Serbian fashion model
 Maja Latinović (born 1980), Serbian fashion model
 Dragana Atlija (born 1983), model and actress
 Sanja Papić (born 1984), Miss Serbia and Montenegro at the Miss Universe 2002
 Sara Brajovic (born 1985) French fashion model
 Tijana Arnautović (born 1986), Miss World Canada
 Ana Mihajlović (born 1987), Serbian fashion model
 Vedrana Grbović (born 1987), model and beauty pageant winner
 Danijela Dimitrovska (born 1987), Serbian fashion model
 Georgina Stojiljković (born 1988), Serbian fashion model
 Olya Ivanisevic (born 1988), Serbian fashion model
 Aleksandra Nikolić (born 1990), Serbian fashion model
 Mila Miletic (born 1991), Serbian fashion model
 Sofija Milošević (born 1991), Serbian fashion model
 Andreja Pejic (born 1991), Australian fashion model
 Veruska Ljubisavljević (born 1991), Miss Venezuela 2018
 Anđelka Tomašević (born 1993), model and beauty pageant winner
 Sara Mitić (born 1995), model and beauty pageant winner

Dancers and choreographers 

 Olgivanna Lloyd Wright (1898–1985), granddaughter of Marko Miljanov and wife of Frank Lloyd Wright
 Nick Kosovich (1909–1947), ballroom dancer and actor
 George Zoritch (1917–2009), Russian dancer and teacher of Serbian antecedents
 Milorad Mišković (1928–2013), ballet dancer and choreographer, honorary president of UNESCO International Dance Council
 Jelena Tinska (born 1953), actress and ballerina
 Tamara Martinović, ballet dancer
 Mia Čolak-Slavenska, prima ballerina

Literature

Writers 

 Buća, noble family, originating in Kotor during the Middle Ages. Some of their antecedents were writers and poets.
 Miroslav of Hum, 12th-century Great Prince (Велики Жупан) of Zachlumia from 1162 to 1190, an administrative division (appanage) of the medieval Serbian Principality (Rascia) covering Herzegovina and southern Dalmatia.
 Anonymous author of the Chronicle of the Priest of Duklja, a 12th-century literary work, preserved in its Latin version only, has all the indication that it was written in Old Slavic, or, at least, that a portion of the material included in it existed previously in the Slavic language.
 Stefan Nemanja (1113–1199), issued an edict called the "Hilandar Charter" for the newly established Serbian monastery at Mount Athos.
 Stefan the First-Crowned (1165–1228), wrote "The Life of Stefan Nemanja", a biography of his father.
 Saint Sava (1174–1236), Serbian royalty and Archbishop, author of oldest known Serbian constitution – the Zakonopravilo . Also, he authored Karyes Typikon in 1199 and Studenica Typikon in 1208.
 Monk Simeon (c. 1170 – 1230), wrote Vukan's Gospel.
 Atanasije (scribe) (c. 1200 – 1265), a disciple of Saint Sava, was a Serbian monk-scribe who wrote a "Hymn to Saint Sava" and a "Eulogy to Saint Sava".
 Grigorije the Pupil, author of Miroslav Gospel and Miroslav of Hum commissioned it.
 Domentijan (c. 1210–died after 1264), Serbian scholar and writer. For most of his life, he was a monk dedicated to writing biographies of clerics, including "Life of St. Sava."
 Bratko Menaion, represents the oldest Serbian transcription of this liturgical book, discovered in the village of Banvani, and written by presbyter Bratko during the reign of king Stefan Vladislav I of Serbia in 1234.
 Stefan Uroš I of Serbia (1223–1277), author of the Ston Charter (1253).
 Theodosius the Hilandarian (1246–1328), technically the first Serbian novelist, wrote biographies of Saint Sava and St. Simeon
 Grigorije II of Ras (1250–1321), monk-scribe 
 Nikodim I (c. 1250 – 1325), Abbot of Hilandar (later Serbian Archbishop), issued an edict (gramma) wherein he grants to the monks of the Kelion of St. Sava in Karyes a piece of land and an abandoned monastery. He translated numerous ancient texts and wrote some poetry. Also, he wrote Rodoslov (The Lives of Serbian Kings and Bishops).
 Dragolj Code, written in 1259 by Serbian monk Dragolj.
 Stanislav of Lesnovo (c. 1280 – 1350), wrote "Oliver's Menologion" in Serbia in 1342.
 Jakov of Serres (1300–1365), author of Triodion.
 Elder Grigorije (fl. 1310–1355), Serbian nobleman and monk, possibly "Danilo's pupil" (Danilov učenik), i.e. the main author of "Žitija kraljeva i arhiepiskopa srpskih".
 Isaija the Monk (14th century), translated the works of Pseudo-Dionysius the Areopagite.
 Anonymous Athonite (also known in Serbia as Nepoznati Svetogorac; late 14th to mid-15th century) was Isaija the Monk's biographer and one of the many unidentified authors of Medieval works.
 Elder Siluan (14th century), author of a hymn to Saint Sava. Hesychasm left a strong imprint in Serbian medieval literature and art, which is evident in works by Domentijan and Teodosije the Hilandarian, but most prominently in the writings of Danilo of Peć, Isaija the Monk and Elder Siluan.
 Stefan Dušan (1308–1355), author of Dušan's Code, the second oldest preserved constitution of Serbia.
 Jefimija (1310–1405), daughter of Caesar Vojihna and widow of Jovan Uglješa Mrnjavčević, took monastic vows and is the author of three found works, including "Praise to Prince Lazar". One of the earliest European female writers.
 Jefrem (patriarch) (c. 1312 – 1400), born in a priestly family, of Bulgarian origin, was the Patriarch of the Serbian Orthodox Church, from 1375 to 1379 and from 1389 to 1392. He was also a poet who left a large body of work, preserved in a 14th-century manuscript from Hilandar Monastery.
 Dorotej of Hilandar, wrote a charter for the monastery of Drenča in 1382.
 Rajčin Sudić (1335 – after 1360), Serbian monk-scribe who lived during the time of Lord Vojihna, the father of Jefimija.
 Cyprian, Metropolitan of Moscow (1336–1406), Bulgarian-born, Serbian clergyman who as the Metropolitan of Moscow wrote The Book of Degrees (Stepénnaya kniga), which grouped Russian monarchs in the order of their generations. The book was published in 1563.
 Saint Danilo II, wrote biographies of Serbian medieval rulers, including the biography of Jelena, the wife of King Stefan Dragutin.
 Antonije Bagaš, translated works from Greek into Serbian.
 Euthymius of Tarnovo, founder of the Tarnovo Literary School that standardized the literary texts of all Orthodox Slavs, including those in Serbia and in Kievan Rus (Ukraine, Belarus, and Russia).
 Nikola Radonja (c. 1330 – 1399), as monk Gerasim, served and helped with great merit Hilandar and other monasteries at Mount Athos, and authored "Gerasim Chronicle" (Gerasimov letopis).
 Princess Milica (1335–1405), consort of Prince Lazar. One of the earliest European female writers.
 Psalter of Branko Mladenović, dated 1346.
 Vrhobreznica Chronicle, also written between 1350 and 1400 by an anonymous monk-scribe.
 Jefrem (patriarch), twice Serbian patriarch, though Bulgarian born. He was also a poet.
 Maria Angelina Doukaina Palaiologina (1350–1394), Serbian writer.
 Gregory Tsamblak (fl. 1409–1420), Bulgarian writer and cleric, abbot of Serbia's Visoki Dečani, wrote A Biography of and Service to St. Stephen Uroš III Dečanski of Serbia, and On the Transfer of Relics of Saint Paraskeva to Serbia.
 Danilo III, Patriarch of the Serbs (c. 1350 – 1400), Serbian patriarch and writer. He wrote Slovo o knezu Lazaru (Narrative About Prince Lazar).
 Nikola Stanjević (fl. 1355), commissioned monk Feoktist to write Tetravangelion at the Hilandar monastery, now on exhibit at the British Museum in London, collection No. 154.
 Jelena Balšić (1366–1443), educated Serbian noblewoman, who wrote the Gorički zbornik, correspondence between her and Nikon of Jerusalem, a monk in Gorica monastery (Jelena's monastic foundation) on Beška (Island) in Zeta under the Balšići.
 Stefan Lazarević (1374–1427), Knez/Despot of Serbia (1389–1427), wrote biographies and poetry, one of the most important Serbian medieval writers. He founded the Resava School at Manasija monastery.
 Đurađ Branković (1377–1456), author psalter Oktoih, published posthumously in 1494 by Hieromonk Makarije, the founder of Serbian and Romanian printing.
 Kir Joakim, late 14th century musical writer.
 Dečani Chronicle, written by an anonymous monk, also from the Resava School made famous by Manasija monastery. Rewritten and published in 1864 by Archimandrite Serafim Ristić of the Dečani Monastery
 Oxford Serbian Psalter, written by an anonymous monk-scribe.
 Munich Serbian Psalter, written by an anonymous monk-scribe.
 Tomić Psalter, named after Simon Tomić, a Serbian art collector, found the 14th century illuminated manuscript in Old Serbia in 1901.
 Dorotheus of Hilandar, author of a charter for the monastery of Drenča (1382).
 Romylos of Vidin, also known as Romylos of Ravanica where he died in the late 1300s.
 Kir Stefan the Serb (late 14th and early 15th century), Serbian monk-scribe and composer.
 Nikola the Serb (late 14th and early 15th century), Serbian monk-scribe and composer.
 Isaiah the Serb, monk-scribe and composer of chants in the 15th century. He finished the translation from Greek to Serbian of the Corpus Areopagiticum, the works of Pseudo-Dionysius the Areopagite, in 1371, and transcribed the manuscripts of Joachim, Domestikos of Serbia.
 Danilo III (patriarch), writer and poet.
 Constantine of Kostenets (fl. 1380–1431), Bulgarian writer and chronicler who lived in Serbia, author of the biography of Despot Stefan Lazarević and of the first Serbian philological study, Skazanije o pismenah (A History on the Letters).
 Kantakuzina Katarina Branković (1418/19–1492), remembered for commissioning the Varaždin Apostol in 1454.
 Radoslav Gospels, work of both Celibate Priest Feodor, also known as "Inok from Dalsa" (fl. 1428–1429), who is credited for transcribing the Radoslav Gospel (Tetraevangelion) in the Serbian recension, now in the National Library of Russia in St. Petersburg. Radoslav is the famed miniaturist who illuminated the pages.
 Jelena Balšić's correspondence with monk Nikon of Jerusalem between 1441 and 1442 is found in Gorički zbornik, named after the island of Gorica in Lake Skadar where Jelena built a church.
 Dimitrije Kantakuzin, while residing in the Rila monastery in 1469 Kantakuzin wrote a biography of Saint John of Rila and a touching "Prayer to the Holy Virgin" imploring her aid in combating sin.
 Konstantin Mihailović (c. 1430 – 1501), the last years of his life were spent in Poland where he wrote his Turkish Chronicle, an interesting document with a detailed description of the historical events of that period as well as various customs of the Turks and Christians.
 Pachomius the Serb (Paxomij Logofet), prolific hagiographer who came from Mount Athos to work in Russia between 1429 and 1484. He wrote eleven saint's lives (zhitie) while employed by the Russian Orthodox Church in Novgorod. He was one of the representatives of the ornamental style known as pletenje slova (word-braiding).
 Dimitar of Kratovo, 15th-century Serb writer and lexicographer of the Kratovo Literary School.
 Ninac Vukoslavić (fl. 1450–1459), chancellor and scribe at the court of Scanderbeg, and author of his letters.
 Deacon Damian who wrote "Koporin Chronicle" in 1453.
 Vladislav the Grammarian (fl. 1456–1483), Serbian monk, writer, historian and theologian.
 Dimitar of Kratovo was a 15th-century Serb writer and lexicographer, one of the most important members of the Kratovo literary school.
 Martin Segon was a Serbian writer, Catholic Bishop of Ulcinj and a 15th-century humanist.
 Lazar of Hilandar After Pachomius the Serb, the most significant Serbian monk in Imperial Russia.
 Benedikt Kuripečič (1491–1531) was the first to record part of the folk songs of the Battle of Kosovo dealing with Miloš Obilić's exploits.
 Stefan Paštrović (fl. 1560–1599), author of two books, engaged a certain hieromonk Sava of Visoki Dečani to print them in Venice at the Francesco Rampazetto and Heirs publishing house in 1597.
 Jakov of Kamena Reka (fl. 1564–1572), worked in the Vuković printing house in Venice with Vićenco Vuković, son of Božidar.
 Radiša Dimitrović owned the Belgrade printing house where many medieval works were published.
 Peja (priest) wrote a poem In the Court and in the Dungeon, from The Service of Saint George of Kratovo, and a biography of the same saint between 1515 and 1523.
 Teodor Ljubavić wrote the Goražde Psalter in 1521.
 Tronoša Chronicle was written in 1526 and transcribed by hieromonk Josif Tronoša in the eighteenth century.
 Jovan Maleševac was a Serbian Orthodox monk and scribe who collaborated in 1561 with the Slovene Protestant reformer Primož Trubar to print religious books in Cyrillic.
 Matija Popović was a 16th-century Serbian Orthodox cleric from Ottoman Bosnia who also supported the Reformation movement.
 Peter Petrovics was a 16th-century Serbian magnate and one of Hungary's most influential and fervent supporters of the Reformation.
 Teodor Račanin (Bajina Bašta, c. 1500–Bajina Bašta, past-1560) was the first Serbian writer and monk of the Rachan Scriptorium School mentioned in Ottoman and Serbian sources.
 Dimitrije Ljubavić (1519–1563) was a Serbian Orthodox deacon, humanist, writer, and printer who sought to bring a rapprochement between the Lutherans and the Eastern Orthodox Church.
 Jovan the Serb of Kratovo (1526–1583) was a Serbian writer and monk whose name is preserved as the author of six books, now part of the Museum Collection of the Serbian Orthodox Church.
 Inok Sava (c. 1530 – after 1597) was the first to write and publish a Serbian Primer (syllabary) at the printing press of Giovanni Antonio Rampazetto in Venice in two editions, first on 20 May and the second on 25 May 1597, after which the book somehow fell into neglect only to be rediscovered recently.
 Pajsije I Janjevac (1542–1649) was a Serbian Patriarch and an author whose works showed an admixture of popular elements.
 Georgije Mitrofanović (c. 1550 – 1630) was a Serbian Orthodox monk and painter whose work can be seen in the church at the Morača monastery.
 Mavro Orbin (1563–1614) was the author of the "Realm of the Slavs" (1601) which made a significant impact on Serbian historiography, influencing future historians, particularly Đorđe Branković (count).
 Zograf Longin (16th century), was an icon painter and writer.
 Jakov of Kamena Reka worked in the Vuković printing house in Venice with Vićenco Vuković.
 Mariano Bolizza (fl. 1614) was a prominent Serbian writer who also wrote in Italian.
 Đorđe Branković, Count of Podgorica (1645–1711), who wrote the first history of Serbia in five volumes.
 Radul of Riđani (fl. 1650–1666) was a Serbian Orthodox priest and chieftain of Riđani, and a prolific letter writer who kept the authorities of Perast informed about Ottoman preparations for the Battle of Perast. A collection of his letters are kept in a museum.
 Kiprijan Račanin (c. 1650 – 1730) was a Serbian writer and monk who founded a copyist school in Szentendre in Hungary, like the one he left behind at the Rača monastery in Serbia at the beginning of the Great Turkish War in 1689.
 Jerotej Račanin (c. 1650 – after 1727) was a Serbian writer and copyist of church manuscripts and books. After visiting Jerusalem in 1704 he wrote a book about his travel experiences from Hungary to the Holy Land and back.
 John of Tobolsk (1651–1715) was a Serbian cleric born in Nizhyn, in the Czernihow Voivodeship of the Polish–Lithuanian Commonwealth of the time, now revered as a saint.
 Čirjak Račanin (Bajina Bašta, c. 1660 – Szentendre, 1731) was a Serbian writer and monk, a member of the famed "School of Rača".
 Sava Vladislavich (1669–1738), framed Peter the Great's proclamation of 1711, translated Mavro Orbin's Il regno de gli Slavi (1601); The Realm of the Slavs) from Italian into Russian, and composed the Treaty of Kiakhta and many others
 Gavril Stefanović Venclović (fl. Bajina Bašta, 1670 – Szentendre, 1749), one of the first and most notable representatives of Serbian Baroque and Enlightenment literature, wrote in the vernacular. Milorad Pavić saw Venclović as a living link between the Byzantine literary tradition and the emerging new views on modern literature. He was the precursor of enlightenment aiming, most of all, to educate the common folk.
 Ivan Krušala (1675–1735) is best known for writing a poem about the Battle of Perast in 1654, among others. He worked in a Russian embassy in China at the time when Sava Vladislavich was the ambassador.
 Simeon Končarević (c. 1690 – 1769), a Serbian writer and Bishop of Dalmatia who, exiled twice from his homeland, settled in Russia where he wrote his chronicles.
 Parteniy Pavlovich (c. 1695 – 1760) was a Serbian Orthodox Church cleric of Bulgarian origin who championed South Slavic revival.
 Danilo I, Metropolitan of Cetinje (1697–1735) was a writer and founder of the Petrović Njegoš dynasty.
 Sava Petrović (1702–1782) wrote numerous letters to the Moscow metropolitan and the Empress Elizabeth of Russia about the deploring conditions of the Serb Nation under occupation by the Turks, Republic of Venice and the Habsburg Empire.
 Pavle Nenadović (1703–1768) was commissioned by Serbian Orthodox Metropolitan of Karlovci, Arsenije IV Jovanović Šakabenta to compose a heraldic book, Stemmatographia.
 Tomo Medin (1725–1788) was a Montenegrin Serb writer and adventurer. He and Casanova had two duels together.
 Zaharije Orfelin (1726–1785), one of the most notable representatives of the Serbian Baroque in art and literature
 Jovan Rajić (1726–1801), writer, historian, traveler, and pedagogue, who wrote the first systematic work on the history of Croats and Serbs
 Mojsije Putnik (1728–1790), Metropolitan, educator, writer, and founder of secondary schools and institutions of higher learning.
 Kiril Zhivkovich (1730–1807) was a Serbian and Bulgarian writer.
 Pavle Julinac (1730–1785) was a Serbian writer, historian, traveler, soldier, and diplomat.
 Simeon Piščević (1731–1797), was a Serbian writer and high-ranking officer in the service of Austria and Imperial Russia.
 Dositej Obradović (1739–1811), influential protagonist of the Serbian national and cultural renaissance, founder of modern Serbian literature
 Nikola Nešković (1740–1789) was a most prolific Serbian icon, fresco and portrait painter in the Baroque style.
 Stefan von Novaković (c. 1740 – 1826) was a Serbian writer and publisher of Serbian books in Vienna and patron of Serbian literature.
 Teodor Janković-Mirijevski (1740–1814), the most influential educational reformer in the Habsburg Empire and Imperial Russia
 Jovan Muškatirović (1743–1809) was one of the early disciples of Dositej Obradović.
 Teodor Ilić Češljar (1746–1793) was one of the best late Baroque Serbian painters from the region of Vojvodina.
 Petar I Petrović Njegoš (1748–1830) was a writer and poet besides being a spiritual and temporal ruler of the "Serb land of Montenegro" as he called it.
 Vićentije Rakić (1750–1818) was a Serbian writer and poet. He founded the School of Theology (now part of the University of Belgrade).
 Stefano Zannowich (1751–1786) was a Montenegrin Serb writer and adventurer. From his early youth, he was prone to challenges and adventures, unruly and dissipated life. He wrote in Italian and French, besides Serbian. He is known for his "Turkish Letters" that fascinated his contemporaries. His works belong to the genre of epistolary novel.
 Hadži-Ruvim (1752–1804) was a Serbian Orthodox archimandrite who documented events and wars in his time, established a private library, wrote library bibliographies, collected books in which he drew ornaments and miniatures. He did wood carving and woodcutting.
 Gerasim Zelić (1752–1828), Serbian Orthodox Church archimandrite, traveller and writer (compatriot of Dositej). His chief work was the travel memoirs Žitije (Lives), which also served as a sociological work.
 Tripo Smeća (1755–1812) was a Venetian historian and writer who wrote in Italian and in Serbian.
 Avram Mrazović (1756–1826) was a Serbian writer, translator and pedagogue.
 Emanuilo Janković (1758–1792) was a Serbian man of letters and of science.
 Sava Tekelija (1761–1842) was the patron of Matica Srpska, a literary and cultural society
 Gligorije Trlajić (1766–1811), writer, poet, polyglot and professor of law at the universities of St. Petersburg and Kharkiv (Harkov), author of a textbook on Civil Law which according to some laid the foundations of Russian civil law doctrine
 Old Rashko (1770–18??), Romanticism
 Tomo Milinović (1770–1846) is a Serbian writer and freedom-fighter. He authored two books, Umotvorina (published posthumously 1847) and Istorija Slavenskog Primorija (lost and never published).
 Jovan Pačić (1771–1848) was a Serbian poet, writer, translator, painter and soldier. He translated Goethe
 Pavel Đurković (1772–1830) was one of the most important Serbian Baroque artists (writers, icon painters, goldsmiths, woodcarvers).
 Joakim Vujić, (1772–1847), writer, dramatist, actor, traveler and polyglot. He is known as the Father of Serbian Theatre.
 Atanasije Stojković (1773–1832) was a Serbian writer, pedagogue, physicist, mathematician and astronomer in the service of Imperial Russia. He also taught mathematics at the university of Kharkiv.
 Živana Antonijević (1770s–1828), Romanticism
 Lukijan Mušicki (1777–1837), Serbian Orthodox abbott, poet, prose writer, and polyglot.
 Matija Nenadović (1777–1854) author of Memoirs, an eyewitness account of the First Serbian Uprising in 1804 and the Second Serbian Uprising in 1815.
 Teodor Filipović (1778–1807), writer, jurist and educator, wrote the Decree of the Governing Council of Revolutionary Serbia. He taught at the newly founded National University of Kharkiv, with his compatriots, Gligorije Trlajić and Atanasije Stojković.
 Stevan Živković-Telemak (1780–1831) is the author of Obnovljene Srbije, 1780–1831 (Serbie nouvelle, 1780–1731) and Serbian translator of François Fénelon's Les Aventures de Telemaque.
 Jovan Došenović (1781–1813) was a Serbian philosopher, poet and translator.
 Sava Mrkalj (1783–1833), devised an alphabet system, which rejected 16 of 42 Slavonic letters.
 Luka Milovanov Georgijević (1784–1828) is considered the first children's poet of new Serbian literature. He collaborated with Vuk Karadžić on the production of grammars and the dictionary.
 Vuk Stefanović Karadžić (1787–1864), Romanticism
 Sofronije Jugović-Marković (fl. 1789) was a Serbian writer and activist in Russian service. He wrote "Serbian Empire and State" in 1792 in order to raise the patriotic spirit of the Serbs in both the Habsburg and Ottoman empires.
 Dimitrije Davidović (1789–1838), Minister of Education of the Principality of Serbia, writer, journalist, publisher, historian, diplomatist, and founder of modern Serbian journalism and publishing.
 Sima Milutinović Sarajlija (1791–1847), poet, hajduk, translator, historian, philologist, diplomat and adventurer. 
 Georgije Magarašević (1793–1830), eminent writer, historian, dramatist, publisher, and founder and first editor of Serbski Letopis.
 Jovan Hadžić (1799–1869) was a Serbian writer and legislator
 Prokopije Čokorilo (1802–1866) is known for his chronicles and a dictionary of Turkish expressions in Serbian. He contributed to the Srbsko-dalmatinski Magazin.
 Jovan Stejić (1803–1853) was a Serbian physician writer, philosopher, translator, and a critic of Vuk Karadžić's language reform.
 Pavle Stamatović (1805–1864)
 Jovan Sterija Popović, (1806–1856), playwright, poet and pedagogue who taught at the University of Belgrade, then known as Grande École (Velika škola).
 Stefan Stefanović (1807–1828). Serbian writer who lived and worked in Novi Sad and Budapest
 Božidar Petranović (1809–1874), Realism
 Nikanor Grujić, (1810–1887), Rationalism to Romanticism
 Petar II Petrović-Njegoš, (1813–1851) works include The Mountain Wreath (Горски вијенац / Gorski vijenac), the Ray of the Microcosm (Луча микрокозма / Luča mikrokozma), the Serbian Mirror (Огледало српско / Ogledalo srpsko), and False Tsar Stephen the Little (Лажни цар Шћепан Мали / Lažni car Šćepan Mali).
 Ognjeslav Utješenović (1817–1890), Rationalism to Romanticism
 Matija Ban (1818–1903), writer, poet, dramatist, politician and diplomat
 Vasa Živković (1819–1891), Rationalism to Romanticism
 Medo Pucić (1821–1882), writer and prominent Serbian nationalist who was one of the leaders of the "Serb-Catholic" Circle.
 Jovan Đorđević (1826–1900), Serbian man of letters, writer of lyrics to the Serbian National anthem
 Svetozar Miletić (1826–1901), writer and editor of a magazine called Slavjanka, in which Serbian students living under Habsburg occupation championed their ideas of national freedom
 Ljubomir Nenadović (1826–1895), writer
 Milorad Pavlović-Krpa (1865–1957), was merchant and writer of epic songs who wrote the earliest collection of urban lyric poetry., writer and early Anton Chekhov translator
 Tešan Podrugović (1775–1815), Romanticism
 Filip Višnjić (1767–1834), Romanticism
 Sava Mrkalj (1783–1833), Romanticism
 Pavle Stamatović (1805–1864)
 Đorđe Marković Koder (1806–1891), Romanticism
 Vuk Vrčević (1811–1882), collaborated with Vuk Karadžić collecting Serbian tales and songs in Montenegro, Bosnia and Herzegovina and Dalmatia along with Vuk Popović
 Mirko Petrović-Njegoš (1820–1867), Romanticism
 Dimitrije Matić (1821–1884)
 Jakov Ignjatović (1822–1889), Realism
 Visarion Ljubiša (1823–1884), Romanticism
 Branko Radičević (1824–1853), Romanticism
 Stjepan Mitrov Ljubiša (1824–1878), Romanticism
 Jovan Sundečić (1825–1900), Romanticism
 Nikša Gradi (1825–1894), Romanticism
 Novak Radonić (1826–1890), Romanticism
 Bogoboj Atanacković (1826–1858)
 Ljubomir Nenadović (1826–1895), Realism
 Milica Stojadinović Srpkinja (1828–1878), Romanticism
 Ivan Stojanović (1829–1900), Romanticism
 Gavrilo Vitković (1829–1902), Realism
 Staka Skenderova (1831–1891), Romanticism, a Bosnian Serb writer, teacher and social worker.
 Milan Đ. Milićević (1831–1908), Realism
 Đura Jakšić (1832–1878), Romanticism
 Ilarion Ruvarac (1832–1905), Romanticism
 Nićifor Dučić (1832–1900), Realism
 Vaso Pelagić (1833–1899), Romanticism
 Vladimir Jovanović (1833–1922), Realism
 Marko Miljanov (1833–1901), Romanticism
 Pero Budmani (1835–1914), Romanticism
 Kosta Ruvarac (1837–1864), Realism
 Ljudevit Vuličević (1839–1916)
 Miloš Crnjanski (1893–1977)
 Laza Kostić (1841–1910), Romanticism
 Nicholas I of Montenegro (1841–1921), Romanticism
 Stojan Novaković (1842–1915)
 Čedomilj Mijatović (1842–1932), Romanticism
 Evgenije Popović (1842–1931)
 Kosta Trifković (1843–1875), Romanticism
 Svetomir Nikolajević (1844–1922), Realism
 Vladan Đorđević (1844–1930), Realism
 Nikodim Milaš (1845–1915), Realism
 Risto Kovačić (1845–1909), Realism
 Svetozar Marković (1846–1875), Realism
 Milovan Glišić (1847–1908), Realism
 Sava Bjelanović (1850–1897), Realism
 Laza Lazarević (1851–1891), Realism
 Dragomir Brzak (1851–1907)
 Simo Matavulj (1852–1908), Realism
 Stevan Sremac (1855–1906), Realism
 Jaša Tomić (1856–1922), Realism
 Ivo Vojnović (1857–1929), Realism
 Ljubomir Nedić (1858–1902), Realism
 Marko Car (1859–1957), Realism
 Vojislav Ilić (1860–1894), Realism
 Milan Rešetar (1860–1942), Realism
 Nikola T. Kašiković (1861–1927)
 Janko Veselinović (writer) (1862–1905), Realism
 Prince Bojidar Karageorgevitch (1862–1908)
 Jelena Dimitrijević (1862–1945)
 Svetolik Ranković (1863–1899), Realism
 Bogdan Popović (1863–1944)
 Antun Fabris (1864–1904), Realism
 Branislav Nušić (1864–1938), Realism to Moderna
 Ilija Vukićević (1866–1899)
 Ivan Ivanić (1867–1935), Realism; a diplomat and an author
 Lujo Bakotić (1867–1941)
 Radoje Domanović (1873–1908), Realism
 Svetozar Ćorović (1875–1919), Realism to Moderna
 Borisav Stanković (1876–1927), Realism
 Petar Kočić (1877–1916), Realism to Moderna 
 Jovan Skerlić (1877–1914)
 Isidora Sekulic (1877–1958)
 Kosta Abrašević (1879–1898), Moderna 
 Jevto Dedijer (1880–1918), Moderna
 Stijepo Kobasica (1882–1944)
 Vojislav Jovanović Marambo (1884–1968), naturalism, kitchen sink drama
 Dimitrije Mitrinović (1887–1953)
 Mir-Jam (1887–1952)
 Jela Spiridonović-Savić (1890–1974)
 Stanislav Vinaver (1891–1965)
 Vladimir Velmar-Janković (1895–1976)
 Rastko Petrović (1898–1949)
 Branko Ve Poljanski (1898–1947)
 Jovan Popović (1905–1952)
 Vladan Desnica (1905–1967)
 Meša Selimović (1910–1982)
 Grigorije Vitez (1911–1966)
 Mihailo Lalić (1914–1992)
 Branko Ćopić (1915–1984)
 Vojin Jelić (1921–2004)
 Dobrica Ćosić (1921–2014)
 Dejan Medaković (1922–2008)
 Duško Radović (1922–1984)
 Bogdan Bogdanović (1922–2010), essayist
 Milo Dor (1923–2005)
 Mateja Matejić (1924–2018)
 Aleksandar Tišma (1924–2003)
 Draginja Adamović (1925–2000)
 Nenad Petrović (1925–2014)
 Miodrag Pavlović (1928–2014)
 Dragan Lukić (1928–2006)
 Milorad Pavić (1929–2009)
 Radomir Belaćević (1929–2005)
 Borislav Pekić (1930–1992)
 Miodrag Bulatović (1930–1991)
 Dragoslav Mihailović (1930–2023)
 Ivan V. Lalić (1931–1966)
 Jovan Ćirilov (1931–2014)
 B. Wongar (born 1932), Serbian-Australian writer who explores traditional Serbian and Australian Aboriginal culture
 Vladimir Voinovich (1932–2018)
 Mika Antić (1932–1986)
 Bora Ćosić (born 1932)
 Slobodan Selenić (1933–1995)
 Živojin Pavlović (1933–1998)
 Duško Trifunović (1933–2006)
 Svetlana Velmar-Janković (1933–2014)
 Sava Babić (1934–2012)
 Grozdana Olujić (1934–2019)
 Danilo Kiš (1935–1989)
 Momo Kapor (1937–2010)
 Branimir Šćepanović (1937–2020)
 Milovan Danojlić (born 1937)
 Mirko Kovač (1938–2013)
 Miroljub Todorović (born 1940)
 Milan Milišić (1941–1991)
 Vida Ognjenović (born 1941)
 Vidosav Stevanović (born 1942)
 Milovan Vitezović (born 1944)
 Pero Zubac (born 1945)
 Raša Papeš (born 1947)
 Dragomir Brajković (1947–2009)
 Jovan Zivlak (born 1947)
 Zoran Živković (born 1948)
 Dušan Kovačević (born 1948)
 Novica Tadić (1949–2011)
 Zoran Spasojević (born 1949)
 Radosav Stojanović (born 1950)
 Svetislav Basara (born 1953)
 Biljana Jovanović (1953–1996)
 Jasmina Tešanović (born 1954)
 Siniša Kovačević (born 1954)
 Radoslav Pavlović (born 1954)
 Vladislav Bajac (born 1954)
 Nenad Prokić (born 1954)
 Dejan Stojanović (born 1959)
 Prvoslav Vujčić (born 1960)
 Goran Petrović (born 1961)
 Vladan Matijević (born 1962)
 Dragomir Dujmov (born 1963)
 Slobodan Savić (born 1964)
 Aleksandar Gatalica (born 1964)
 Uroš Petrović (born 1967)
 Zoran Stefanović (born 1969)
 Branislava Ilić (born 1970)
 Biljana Srbljanović (born 1970)
 Vesna Perić (born 1972)
 Jelena Ćirić (born 1973), Serbian writer from Prague
 Aleksandar Novaković (born 1975)
 Aleksandra Čvorović (born 1976), Serbian writer from Banja Luka
 Srđan Srdić (born 1977)
 Tanja Stupar-Trifunović (born 1977), writer from Bosnia, winner of the European Union Prize for Literature
 Olivia Sudjic (born 1988), British fiction writer

Poets

 Paskoje Primojević (fl. 1482–1527) was a poet and Serbian scribe in the Serbian Chancellery in Dubrovnik during the time of the Republic of Ragusa.
 Dimitrije Karaman, born in Lipova, Arad, in the early 1500s, was an early Serbian poet and bard.
 Ludovico Pasquali (Ljudevit Pašković) was an Italian poet and Venetian soldier of Serbian origin, though Roman Catholic by faith, who lived in the early and mid-1500s.
 Hristofor Žefarović (1690–1753), Serbian poet who died in Imperial Russia spreading the Pan-Slav culture.
 Vasilije III Petrović-Njegoš (1709–1766), Serbian Orthodox Metropolitan of Montenegro, wrote patriotic poetry and the first history of Montenegro, published in Moscow in 1754
 Jovan Avakumović (1748–1810), known as a representative of the Serbian folk poetry of the 18th century, though he only wrote a few poems which were part of handwritten poem books.
 Pavle Solarić (1779–1821) was Obradović's disciple who wrote poetry and the first book on geography in the vernacular.
 Aleksije Vezilić (1753–1792) was a Serbian lyric poet who introduced the Teutonic vision of the Enlightenment to the Serbs.
 Avram Miletić (1755 – after 1826) was a merchant and writer of epic folk sings.
 Mato Vodopić (1816–1893) was a Serb-Catholic Bishop of Dubrovnik and poet, Romanticism
 Jovan Jovanović Zmaj (1833–1904), Romanticism
 Mileta Jakšić (1863–1935), Realism to Moderna
 Aleksa Šantić (1868–1924), Realism to Moderna
 Jovan Dučić (1871–1943), Moderna
 Milan Rakić (1876–1938), Moderna
 S. Avdo Karabegović (1878–1908)
 Osman Đikić (1879–1912)
 Vladislav Petković Dis (1880–1917), Moderna
 Sima Pandurović (1883–1960), Moderna
 Veljko Petrović (poet) (1884–1967), Moderna
 Momčilo Nastasijević (1894–1938), poet
 Desanka Maksimović (1898–1993)
 Dušan Matić (1898–1980)
 Rade Drainac (1899–1943)
 Dušan Vasiljev (1900–1924)
 Dragan Aleksić (1901–1958), founder of the Yugoslavian branch of Dadaism
 Milan Dedinac (1902–1966)
 Radovan Zogović (1907–1986), leading Serb poet and literary critic from Montenegro
 Milena Pavlović-Barili (1909–1945)
 Oskar Davičo (1909–1989)
 Millosh Gjergj Nikolla (1911–1938), Albanian poet
 Branko Miljković (1934–1961)
 Ljubomir Simović (born 1935)
 Dobrica Erić (1936–2019)
 Charles Simic (1938–2023)
 Matija Bećković (born 1939)
 Ljubivoje Ršumović (born 1939)

Journalists

 Mihailo Polit-Desančić (1833–1920)
 Sava Bjelanović (1850–1897)
 Maga Magazinović (1882–1968), Serbia's 1st female journalist and women's rights activist
 Milorad Sokolović (born 1922), sports journalist
 Vasilije Stojković (1923–2008), sports journalist
 Zaharije Trnavčević (1926–2016)
 Ranko Munitić (1934–2009), film critic
 Gordana Suša (1946–2021), television journalist and columnist
 Milorad Vučelić (born 1948)
 Stojan Cerović (1949–2005), writer for the magazine Vreme
 Miroslav Lazanski (1950–2021), journalist, military analyst, politician, and diplomat
 Walt Bogdanich (born 1950), American investigative journalist and three-time recipient of the Pulitzer Prize.
 Milan Pantić (1954–2001)
 Saša Marković Mikrob (1959–2010)
 Ljiljana Aranđelović (born 1963), news paper editor
 Dejan Ristanović (born 1963)
 Dada Vujasinović (1964–1994), columnist
 Brankica Stanković (born 1975), Serbian investigative journalist
 Zoran Kesić (born 1976), TV presenter and talk-show host
 Vukša Veličković (born 1979), British cultural critic of Serbian descent
 Mirjana Bjelogrlić-Nikolov (born 1961), television journalist
 Jasmina Karanac (born 1967), television journalist
 Ivan Kalauzović Ivanus (born 1986), journalist and publicist; diaspora chronicler
 Dubravka Lakić, film critic
 Jelena Adzic, Serbian-born Canadian CBC journalist and on-air personality
 Saša Petricic, Canadian award-winning CBC journalist
 Anka Radakovich, American magazine columnist
 Tijana Ibrahimovic, Serbian-born American fashion journalist

Editors and publishers 

 Andrija Paltašić (1440–1500), early printer and publisher of Serb books.
 Bonino De Boninis (1454–1528), early printer and publisher in Dubrovnik.
 Božidar Vuković (1460–1530) and later his son, Vićenco Vuković, ran his father's print shop in Venice, from 1519 until 1561, with partners Stefan Marinović, Jerolim Zagurović, Jakov of Kamena Reka and others. The best known presses were established in 1519 in Goražde; at the Monastery of Rujno in the village of Bioska, near Užice; at Gračanica monastery in Kosovo; and at Mileševa monastery, near Prijepolje. In 1597 the Vuković press passed into the hands of Giorgio Rampazetto, who printed two important books—the Collection of Trvelers and the earliest Serbian primer.
 Hieromonk Makarije (1465 – c. 1530) is the founder of Serbian and Romanian printing, having printed the first book in the Serbian language in Obod (Crnagora) in 1493, and the first book in Wallachia. He also wrote extensively.
 Hieromonk Pahomije (c. 1480 – 1544) learned the skills of the printing trade from Hieromonk Makarije at the Crnojević printing house.
 Božidar Goraždanin founded the Goražde printing house in the 1520s.
 Luka Radovanović (15th century), was a 15th-century Serb Catholic priest from Ragusa who owned a small printing press, one of the earliest at the time.
 Đurađ Crnojević (fl. 1490–1496), first printed the Oktoih at Cetinje in 1495.
 Trojan Gundulić (c. 1500 – c. 1555), is remembered for printing the first book in Belgrade in 1552, "The Four Gospels".
 Hieromonk Mardarije (fl. 1550–1568) used to print his books at Mrkšina crkva printing house before the Ottomans destroyed it.
 Jerolim Zagurović (c. 1550 – 1580), was a Catholic-Serb printer from Kotor.
 Vićenco Vuković (fl. 1560–1571), was one of the major printers of 16th century Serbia, like his father before him.
 Stefan Marinović (fl. 1561–1563), was a Serb printer from Scutari during the time of Vićenco Vuković, Jerolim Zagurović, Jakov of Kamena Reka and others. The longest-lived printing in the Balkans was done at Scutari, where Stefan Skadranin worked between 1563 and 1580. When his press stopped, because of continued Turkish authority over the region, Serbian printing left the Balkans. Later, Serbian books were printed in Venice, Leipzig, Vienna, and Trieste.
 Mojsije Dečanac (fl. 1536–40) is remembered for printing Praznićni minej (Holiday Menaion) of Božidar Vuković in Venice in 1538.
 Hieromonk Genadije was another printer who worked alongside hieromonk Teodosije at Mileševa monastery and later in Venice with hierodeacon Mojsije and hieromonk Teodosije.
 Luka Primojević (16th century), is another early printer of the 16th century from Ragusa to use Church Slavonic, Cyrillic type.
 Stefan Vujanovski (1743–1829)
 Gligorije Vozarević (1790–1848)
 Vasa Pelagić (1833–1800), publisher, socialist
 Dimitrije Ruvarac (1842–1931)
 Vladislav F. Ribnikar (1871–1914)
 Darko F. Ribnikar (1878–1914)
 Stijepo Kobasica (1882–1944)
 Velibor Gligorić (1899–1977), literary critic, editor, and writer
 Danilo Gregorić (1900–1957), news paper editor
 Drenka Willen, Serbian-American award-winning editor, formerly with Harcourt Brace Jovanovich Inc.

Translators

 Okica Gluščević (1856–1898)
 Dimitrije Vladisavljević (1788–1858) is a Serbian grammarian, translator and writer.

Scholars and scientists

Scientists and inventors 

 Lazar the Hilandarian (fl. 1404), Serbian Orthodox monk who built the first mechanical clock tower in Russia

 Ignác Martinovics (1790–1838), Hungarian scholar of Serb descent
 Dimitrije Frušić (1790–1838), prominent medical doctor and journalist based in Trieste
 Josif Pančić (1814–1888), botanist
 Dimitrije Nešić (1836–1904), mathematician
 Sava Petrović (1839–1889), botanist
 Ljubomir Klerić (1844–1910), mining engineer and mathematician
 Sima Lozanić (1847–1935), chemist
 Laza Lazarević (1851–1891), physician
 Ognjeslav Kostović Stepanović (1851–1916), created "arbonite" (i.e. plywood).
 Marko Leko (1853–1932), chemist
 Mihajlo Idvorski Pupin (1854–1935), physicist, professor and inventor of a new telecommunications technology
 Draga Ljočić (1855–1926), Serbia's first female doctor and women's rights activist
 Spiridon Gopčević (1855–1928), astronomer, also known by his nom de plume Leo Brenner, friend of American astronomer Percival Lowell
 Nikola Tesla (1856–1943), Serbian American physicist, inventor, and engineer known for his advancements in electrical power
 Jovan Žujović (1856–1938), pioneer in geological and paleontological science in Serbia
 Vuk Marinković (1807–1859), physicist
 Bogdan Gavrilović (1864–1947), mathematician
 Lujo Adamović (1864–1935), botanist
 Jovan Cvijić (1865–1927), geographer, ethnographer and geologist
 Vladimir Varićak (1865–1942), mathematician and theoretical physicist
 Mihailo Petrović Alas (1868–1943), author of the mathematical phenomenology and inventor of the first hydraulic computer capable to solve differential equations
 Mileva Marić (1875–1948), mathematician, wife of Albert Einstein
 Milutin Milanković (1879–1958), geophysicist, astronomer, writer, professor
 Pavle Vujević (1881–1966), founder of the science of microclimatology, and one of the first in the science of potamology
 Ivan Đaja (1884–1957), biologist and physiologist
 Jovan Hadži (1884–1972), Slovenian zoologist
 Jovan Čokor (1885–1946), epidemiologist
 Siniša Stanković (1892–1974), biologist
 Ilija Đuričić (1898–1965), veterinary physician
 Jovan Karamata (1902–1967), mathematician
 Danilo Blanusa (1903–1987), mathematician, of Serb heritage
 Tatomir Anđelić (1903–1993), mathematician
 Đuro Kurepa (1907–1993), mathematician
 Petar Đurković (1908–1981), astronomer
 Dragoslav Mitrinović (1908–1995), mathematician
 Petar Đurković (1908–1981), astronomer
 Pavle Savić (1909–1994), physicist and chemist, together with Irène Joliot-Curie he was nominated for Nobel Prize in Physics
 Milorad B. Protić (1911–2001), astronomer
 Rajko Tomović (1919–2001), physicist and inventor
 Dušan Kanazir (1921–2009), molecular biologist
 Obrad Vučurović (1921–2013), rocket scientist
 Nikola Hajdin (1923–2019), construction engineer
 Aleksandar Despić (1927–2005), physicist
 Bogdan Maglich (1928–2017), a nuclear physicist
 Mihajlo D. Mesarovic (born 1928), scientist and Club of Rome member
 Jovan Rašković (1929–1992), psychiatrist
 Svetozar Kurepa (1929–2010), mathematician
 Tihomir Novakov (1929–2015), physicist
 Petar Gburčik (1931–2006), scientist and a professor of meteorology at the University of Belgrade. He was the author of the first mathematical models of the numerical weather prediction, which were used operationally in the Weather Service of Yugoslavia from 1970 to 1977. In the same period, he began modelling of the atmospheric diffusion of air-pollution and created the first model of the spatial distribution of air-pollution
 Miomir Vukobratovic (1931–2012), mechanical engineer and pioneer in humanoid robots
 Ljubisav Rakic (born 1931–2022), neurobiologist
 Dušan Ristanović (born 1933), medical biophysicist
 Miodrag Radulovacki (1933–2014), neuropharmacologist and professor
 Milan Kurepa (1933–2000), physicist
 Petar V. Kokotovic (born 1934), engineering professor and theorist
 Milan Raspopović (born 1936), mathematician
 Milan Vukcevich (1937–2003), chemist and grandmaster of chess problem composition
 Miodrag Petković (born 1938), mathematician
 Gordana Vunjak-Novakovic (born 1948), biomedical engineer
 Gradimir Milovanović (born 1948), mathematician
 Zoran Knežević (born 1949), astronomer
 Bogdan Duricic (1950–2008), biochemist
 Zorica Pantic (born 1951), engineer and president of Wentworth Institute of Technology
 Marko V. Jaric (1952–1997), physicist
 Milivoje Kostic (born 1952), thermodynamicist and professor emeritus of mechanical engineering 
 Voja Antonić (born 1952), inventor, journalist, writer, magazine editor, radio show contributor, also creator of a build-it-yourself home computer Galaksija
 Milan Damnjanović (born 1953), physicist
 Jasmina Vujic (born 1953), nuclear engineering professor at Berkeley, 1st female nuclear engineering department chair in the US
 Stevo Todorčević (born 1955), mathematician
 Slobodan Antonić (born 1959), sociologist
 Milomir Kovac (born 1962), veterinary surgeon and professor
 Miodrag Stojković (born 1964), genetic scientist
 Ljubinka Nikolić (born 1964), geographer and geologist, future colonist chosen for the Mars One project (representing Serbia)
 Aleksandar Kavčić (born 1968), electrical engineer and university professor 
 Maja Pantic (born 1970), A.I. expert and professor
 Jovo Bakić (born 1970), sociologist
 Vlatko Vedral (born 1971), physicist, known for his research on the theory of Entanglement and Quantum Information Theory
 Vladimir Markovic (born 1973), mathematician
 Dušanka Đokić (born 1983), physicist
 Teodor von Burg (born 1993), most successful participant of the International Mathematical Olympiad, 4 gold, 1 silver, 1 bronze medal
 Vesna Milosevic-Zdjelar, Serbian born Canadian astrophysicist and science educator
 Jelena Kovacevic, Dean of Engineering at NYU's Tandon School and Carnegie Mellon University
 Gojko Lalic, chemistry professor at the University of Washington

Philosophers 

 Dositej Obradović (1742–1811), author, philosopher, linguist, polyglot and the first minister of education of Serbia.
 Andrej Dudrovich (1783–1830), Russian national of Serb origin
 Petar II Petrović-Njegoš (1813–1851)
 Vladimir Jovanović (1833–1922)
 Svetozar Marković (1846–1875), sociologist
 Ljubomir Nedić (1858–1902), one of the most quoted philosophers in the late 19th century, a student of Wilhelm Wundt and professor at the University of Belgrade
 Branislav Petronijević (1875–1954), philosopher and paleontologist in the first half of the 20th century
 Veselin Čajkanović (1881–1946)
 Ion Petrovici (1882–1972), Romanian national of Serbian antecedents
 Dimitrije Mitrinović (1887–1953), philosopher, poet, revolutionary, mystic, theoretician of modern painting, traveller and cosmopolite.
 Justin Popović (1894–1979)
 Ksenija Atanasijević (1894–1981), philosopher and professor of Belgrade University
 Dimitrije Najdanović (1897–1986)
 Đuro Kurepa (1907–1992), logician
 Jevrem Jezdić (1916–1997)
 Mihailo Marković (1923–2010)
 Milan Damnjanović (1924–1994)
 Ljubomir Tadić (1925–2013)
 Mihailo Đurić (1925–2011)
 Gajo Petrović (1927–1993)
 Branko Pavlović (1928–1996)
 Nikola Milošević (1929–2007)
 Svetozar Stojanović (1931–2010)
 Thomas Nagel (born 1937)
 Divna M. Vuksanović (born 1965)
 Vojin Rakić (born 1967)
 Davor Džalto (born 1980)

Historians and archeologists 

 Jovan Rajić (1726–1801)
 Jovan Gavrilović (1796–1877), historian, politician, statesman, and public figure. He was the first President of the Serbian Learned Society. 
 Božidar Petranović (1809–1874), wrote the history of world literature in the 1840s
 Gavrilo Vitković (1829–1902)
 Jovan Ristić (1831–1899)
 Nićifor Dučić (1832–1900), theologian, historian and writer
 Ilarion Ruvarac (1832–1905)
 Stojan Bošković (1833–1908)
 Panta Srećković (1834–1903)
 Mihailo Valtrović (1839–2015), archeologist
 Stojan Novaković (1842–1915)
 Risto Kovačić (1845–1909)
 Ljubomir Kovačević (1848–1918)
 Vid Vuletic Vukasović (1853–1933)
 Spiridon Gopčević (1855–1928)
 Prince Bojidar Karageorgevitch (1862–1908)
 Mihailo Gavrilović (1868–1924)
 Tihomir Đorđević (1868–1944)
 Slobodan Jovanović (1869–1958)
 Miloje Vasić (1869–1956), archaeologist
 Stanoje Stanojević (1873–1937)
 Jovan Radonić (1873–1953)
 Vladimir Petković (1874–1956)
 Dragutin Anastasijević (1877–1950)
 Dragutin Anastasijević (1877–1950)
 Vladimir Ćorović (1885–1941)
 Milan Kašanin (1895–1981)
 Vaso Čubrilović (1897–1990)
 Miodrag Grbic (1901–1969), archaeologist
 Milos Mladenovic (1903–1984), professor emeritus at McGill in Montreal
 Djoko Slijepčević, (1907–1993), church historian
 Svetozar Radojčić (1909–1978)
 Wayne S. Vucinich (1913–2005)
 Vladimir Dedijer (1914–1990)
 Jevrem Jezdić (1916–1997)
 Traian Stoianovich (1921–2005)
 Milorad M. Drachkovitch (1921–1996)
 Dejan Medaković (1922–2008)
 Desanka Kovačević-Kojić (1925–2022)
 Branko Petranović (1927–1994)
 Milan Vasić (1928–2003)
 Milorad Ekmečić (1928–2015)
 Lazar Trifunović (1929–1983)
 Sima Ćirković (1929–2009)
 Božidar Ferjančić (1929–1998), historian and Byzantine scholar
 Vasilije Krestić (born 1932)
 Latinka Perović (1933–2022)
 Rade Mihaljčić (1937–2020)
 Momčilo Spremić (born 1937)
 Gordana Lazarevich (born 1939), Serbian born Canadian musicologist and university department head
 Predrag Dragić (1945–2012)
 Radivoj Radić (born 1954)
 Miroljub Jevtić (born 1955)
 Milan St. Protić (born 1957)
 Željko Fajfrić (born 1957)
 Dušan T. Bataković (1957–2017), historian and diplomat
 Anna Novakov (born 1959)
 Tibor Živković (1966–2013)
 Miloš Ković (born 1969)
 Lidija Seničar (born 1973)
 Čedomir Antić (born 1974)

Linguists and philogists 

 Sava Mrkalj (1783–1833)
 Luka Milovanov Georgijević (1784–1828)
 Vuk Stefanović Karadžić (1787–1864), philologist and linguist who was the major reformer of the Serbian language
 Vukašin Radišić (1810–1843), the first Serbian classical philologists to teach poetics
 Đuro Daničić (1825–1882), collaborated with Vuk Karadžić in reforming and standardizing the Serbian language, and translating the Bible from old Serbo-Slavonic into modern-day Serbian
 Katarina Milovuk (1844–1909)
 Svetomir Nikolajevic (1844–1922), first professor at the Department of World Literature in Belgrade's School of Philosophy.
 Luko Zore (1846–1906)
 Milan Rešetar (1860–1942), linguist, Ragusologist, historian and literary critic
 Pavle Popović (1868–1939), literary critic and historian
 Nikola Vulić (1872–1945)
 Aleksandar Belić (1876–1960)
 Miloš Trivunac (1876–1944)
 Dragutin Anastasijević (1877–1950)
 Milan Budimir (1891–1975)
 Miloš N. Đurić (1892–1967), classical philologist, hellenist, classical translator and philosopher
 Emil Petrovici (1899–1968), Romanian linguist, who studied both Romanian and Slavic languages.
 Mateja Matejić (priest) (1924–2018), Slavist
 Pavle Ivić (1924–1999) was a leading South Slavic dialectologist and phonologist
 Mateja Matejić (1924–2018) 
 Predrag Palavestra (1930–2014)
 Ljiljana Crepajac (born 1931)
 Nikola Moravčević (born 1935), literary historian and literary critic
 Ivan Klajn (born 1937)
 Branko Mikasinovich (born 1938), Slavist
 Vladeta Janković (born 1940)
 Ljubiša Rajić (1947–2012)
 Darko Tanasković (born 1948)
 Aleksandar Loma (born 1955)
 Dejan Ajdačić (born 1959)
 Miodrag Kojadinović (born 1961)
 Milo Lompar (born 1962)
 Rajna Dragićević (born 1968)

Economists and sociologists

 Valtazar Bogišić (1834–1908), jurist and a pioneer in sociology.
 Lazar Paču (1855–1915)
 Milan Stojadinović (1888–1961), Minister of Finance, Prime Minister of Yugoslavia 1935–1939
 Dragoslav Avramović (1919–2001)
 Radovan Kovačević, Serbian-American professor at the Southern Methodist University Research Center for Advanced Manufacturing, holder of several U.S. patents.
 Sreten Sokić (born 1945)
 Miroljub Labus (born 1947), political economist
 Čedomir Čupić (born 1947)
 Branko Milanović (born 1953), leading economist in the World Bank's research department dealing with poverty and inequality, also a senior associate at the Carnegie Endowment for International Peace in Washington, D.C.
 Branislav Andjelić (born 1959)
 Jorgovanka Tabaković (born 1960)
 Kori Udovički (born 1961)
 Dejan Šoškić (born 1967)
 Radovan Jelašić (born 1968), Governor of the National Bank of Serbia 2004–2010
 Dušan Pavlović (professor) (born 1969)

Legal experts and lawyers 

 Atanasije Dimitrijević Sekereš (1738–1794)
 Sava Tekelija (1761–1842), amongst the first Serbian doctor of law, president of the Matica srpska, philanthropist, noble, and merchant. Tekelija founded the Tekelijanum in Budapest in 1838 for Serb students studying in the city.
 Gligorije Trlajić (1766–1811)
 Teodor Filipović (1778–1807), lawyer and professor who taught at the university of Harkov
 Konstantin Vojnović (1832–1903), politician, university professor and rector at University of Zagreb
 Nikodim Milaš (1845–1915), Serbian Orthodox bishop, polyglot, authority on church law and the Slavistics.
 Dragić Joksimović (1893–1951)
 Kosta Čavoški (born 1941), professor at the University of Belgrade's Law School and an outspoken critic of the International Criminal Tribunal for the former Yugoslavia.
 Sima Avramović (born 1950)
 Milan Antonijević (born 1975)

Sportspeople

Athletics

 Dragutin Tomašević (1890–1915), track and field athlete 
 Dragomir Tošić (1909-1985), football defender for Yugoslavia's National Team for the first World Cup, Member of the prominent Tošić family
 Mirjana Bilić (born 1936)
 Nenad Stekić (1951–2021), long jumper
 Jovan Lazarević (born 1952), shot putter
 Vladimir Milić (born 1955), shot putter
 Miloš Srejović (born 1956), track and field athlete
 Dragan Zdravković (born 1959), middle-distance runner.
 Biljana Petrović (born 1961), high jumper
 Slobodan Branković (born 1967), track and field athlete
 Snežana Pajkić (born 1970), middle-distance runner
 Olivera Jevtić (born 1977), long-distance runner
 Biljana Topić (born 1977), triple jumper
 Marija Šestak (born 1979), athletics
 Marina Munćan (born 1982), middle-distance runner
 Christina Vukicevic (born 1983), athletics, Eureopan U23 champion
 Mihail Dudaš (born 1989), decathlete and heptathlete
 Tatjana Jelača (born 1990), javelin thrower
 Ivana Španović (born 1990), track and field athlete

Boxing 

 Zvonimir Vujin (1943–2019), Olympic medalist
 Svetomir Belić (born 1946), boxer
 Marijan Beneš (born 1951), Light Heavyweight, European Amateur Boxing Championship 1973 Gold, European Boxing Union 1979
 Sreten Mirković (1955–2016), European Amateur Boxing Championship 1979 Silver
 Tadija Kačar (born 1956), Light Heavyweight, Olympic Silver Montréal 1976
 Slobodan Kačar (born 1957), Light Heavyweight, Olympic Gold Moscow 1980
 Aleksandar Pejanović (1974–2011), Super Heavyweight, Bronze 2001 Mediterranean Games
 Neven Pajkić (born 1977), Bosnian Serb, Canadian Boxing Federation Champion
 Nenad Borovčanin (born 1978), current European Cruiserweight boxing champion, undefeated with 30 wins and no losses
 Nikola Sjekloća (born 1978), Intercontinental 75 kg WBC
 Nenad Borovčanin (born 1979), boxer
 Geard Ajetović (born 1981), welterweight
 Zdravko Mićević (born 1982), Serbian-born Australian light-heavyweight champion
 Marco Huck (born 1984), Serbian-born German, cruiserweight, world champion

Basketball 

 Press Maravich (1915–1987), basketball
 John Abramovic (1919–2000)
 Nebojša Popović (1923–2001)
 Mike Todorovich (1923–2000)
 Aleksandar Nikolić "Aca" (1924–2000), FIBA Hall of Fame, Euroleague Top 10 coaches; WC Coach 78', EC Coach 77', EC Cup 70', 72', 73'
 Borislav Stanković (1925–2020)
 Ranko Žeravica (1929–2015)
 Trajko Rajković (1937–1970)
 Radivoj Korać "Žućko" (1938–1969), FIBA Hall of Fame; top 50 in Europe, Euro MVP 61', Eponymous to FIBA Cup
 Vladimir Cvetković (born 1941), Olympic medalist
 Dušan Ivković "Duda" (born 1943), Euroleague Top 10 coaches; FIBA Coach 90', EC Coach 89', 91', 95'; EC Player 73'
 Peter Maravich (1947–1988)
 Nikola Plećaš (born 1948)
 Dragan Kapičić (born 1948)
 Svetislav Pešić (born 1949)
 Zoran Slavnić (born 1949)
 Ljubodrag Simonović (born 1949)
 Gregg Popovich (born 1949), basketball coach
 Zarko Zecevic (born 1950)
 Dražen Dalipagić "Praja" (born 1951), FIBA Hall of Fame; Mr. Europ
 Božidar Maljković "Boža" (born 1952), Euroleague Top 10 coaches, EL Coach
 Dragan Kićanović (born 1953), FIBA Hall of Fame; Mr. Europa
 Vukica Mitić (1953–2019), Olympic medalist
 Sofija Pekić (born 1953), Olympic medalist
 Rajko Toroman (born 1955), coach
 Ratko Radovanović (born 1956), Olympic medalist
 Zorica Đurković (born 1957), Olympic medalist
 Duško Vujošević (born 1959)
 Aleksandar Petrović (1959–2014)
 Biljana Majstorović (born 1959), Olympic medalist
 Jasmina Perazić (born 1960), Olympic medalist
 Željko Obradović (born 1960), 50 Greatest Euroleague Contributors
 Slađana Golić (born 1960), Olympic medalist
 Jelica Komnenović (born 1960), Olympic medalist
 Zoran Radović (born 1961)
 Zoran Sretenović (born 1964)
 Radisav Ćurčić (born 1965), Israeli Basketball Premier League MVP
 Bojana Milošević (1965–2020), Olympic medalist
 Zoran Savić (born 1966)
 Branislav Prelević (born 1966)
 Aleksandar Đorđević (born 1967), Top 50 in Europe, Mr. Europa 94', 95', Euro MVP 97'
 Anđelija Arbutina (born 1967), Olympic medalist
 Vlade Divac (born 1968), FIBA Hall of Fame; Top 50 in Europe, Mr. Europa 89'; Kennedy Award 00'; NBA All-Star 01'
 Miloš Babić (born 1968)
 Radenko Dobraš (born 1968)
 Nenad Marković (born 1968)
 Milenko Topić (born 1969), Olympic medalist
 Predrag Danilović (born 1970), Top 50 in Europe, Mr. Europa and Italian League MVP 1998; EC 89', 91', 95', 97'
 Igor Kokoškov (born 1971)
 Željko Rebrača (born 1972)
 Dejan Koturović (born 1972)
 Nikola Lončar (born 1972), Olympic medalist
 Gordana Grubin (born 1972), WNBA player
 Dejan Bodiroga (born 1973) Top 10 in 2000s Europe
 Dejan Tomašević (born 1973)
 Dragan Tarlać (born 1973)
 Miroslav Berić (born 1973)
 Predrag Drobnjak (born 1975)
 Milan Gurović (born 1975)
 Dragan Lukovski (born 1975)
 Predrag Stojaković (born 1977)
 Dušan Kecman (born 1977)
 Dejan Milojević (born 1977)
 Igor Rakočević (born 1978)
 Marko Jarić (born 1978), (NBA) EuroBasket 2001, 1st 2002 FIBA World Championship
 Ratko Varda (born 1979)
 Petar Popović (born 1979)
 Ivanka Matić (born 1979)
 Vladimir Radmanović (born 1980)
 Miloš Vujanić (born 1980)
 Žarko Čabarkapa (born 1981)
 Marko Popović (born 1982)
 Milica Dabović (born 1982)
 Nenad Krstić (born 1983), All-Rookie NBA second team, EC Silver 09'
 Slavko Vraneš (born 1983)
 Sasha Pavlović (born 1983)
 Bojan Popović (born 1983)
 Velimir Radinović (born 1983)
 Duško Savanović (born 1983)
 Ivana Matović (born 1983)
 Mile Ilić (born 1984)
 Aleksandar "Aleks" Marić (born 1984)
 Sasha Vujačić (born 1984)
 Aleks Marić (born 1984)
 Kosta Perović (born 1985)
 Darko Miličić (born 1985), NBA champion 2004
 Nikola Peković (born 1986), NBA
 Goran Dragić (born 1986), NBA
 Novica Veličković (born 1986)
 Miloš Teodosić (born 1987)
 Nikola Dragovic (born 1987)
 Miljana Bojović (born 1987)
 Tamara Radočaj (born 1987)
 Nemanja Bjelica (born 1988)
 Boban Marjanović (born 1988)
 Sonja Vasić (born 1989), WNBA player
 Jelena Milovanović (born 1989)
 Ana Dabović (born 1989)
 Bogdan Bogdanović (born 1992)
 Nikola Milutinov (born 1994)
 Nikola Jokić (born 1995), NBA All-star
 Vasilije Micić (born 1994)

Football 

 Milutin Ivković (1906–1943)
 Blagoje Marjanović (1907–1984)
 Đorđe Vujadinović (1909–1990)
 Aleksandar Tirnanić (1910–1992)
 Ljubiša Broćić (1911–1995)
 Milovan Ćirić (1918–1986)
 Aleksandar Atanacković (born 1920), Olympic medalist
 Ljubomir Lovrić (1920–1994), Olympic medalist
 Branko Stanković (1921–2002)
 Prvoslav Mihajlović (1921–1978), Olympic medalist
 Rajko Mitić (1922–2008)
 Tihomir Ognjanov (1927–2006)
 Zdravko Rajkov ( 1927–2006), Olympic medalist
 Vladimir Beara (1928–2014)
 Borivoje Kostić (1930–2011)
 Miljan Miljanić (1930–2012)
 Todor Veselinović (1930–2017)
 Bora Kostić (1930–2011), Olympic medalist
 Vujadin Boškov (1931–2014)
 Dobrosav Krstić (1932–2015), Olympic medalist
 Miloš Milutinović (1933–2003)
 Blagoje Vidinić (1934–2006), Olympic medalist
 Petar Radenković (born 1934), Olympic medalist
 Vladica Popović (1935–2020), Olympic medalist
 Žarko Nikolić (1936–2011), Olympic medalist
 Vladimir Durković (1937–1972)
 Dragoslav Šekularac (1937–2019)
 Milutin Šoškić (1937–2022)
 Milan Galić (1938–2014)
 Velibor Vasović (1939–2002)
 Velimir Sombolac (1939–2016), Olympic medalist
 Vladica Kovačević (1940–2016), 1963–64 UEFA Champions League Top Scorer
 Ilija Pantelić (1942–2014)
 Ljubomir Mihajlović (born 1943)
 Ilija Petković (1945–2020)
 Dragan Džajić (born 1946)
 Doug Utjesenovic (born 1946), member of the Australian 1974 World Cup Squad
 Slobodan Santrač (1946–2016)
 Ljupko Petrović (born 1947), UEFA European Cup/Champions League winning manager
 Blagoje Paunović (1947–2014)
 Jovan Aćimović (born 1948)
 Dušan Bajević (born 1948)
 Radomir Antić (1948–2020)
 Dušan Bajević (born 1948)
 Dragoslav Stepanović (born 1948)
 Vladislav Bogićević (born 1950)
 Milovan Rajevac (born 1954)
 Vladimir Petrović (born 1955)
 Dušan Savić (born 1955)
 Steve Ogrizovic (born 1957), football
 Jovica Nikolić (born 1959), Olympic medalist
 Ivan Jovanović (born 1962)
 Borislav Cvetković (born 1962), Olympic medalist, 1986–87 UEFA Champions League Top Scorer
 Preki (born 1963), American player, named Major League Soccer MVP twice
 Miodrag Belodedici (born 1964)
 Stevan Stojanović (born 1964)
 Dragan Stojković (born 1965)
 Miroslav Đukić (born 1966)
 Milinko Pantić (born 1966), 1996–97 UEFA Champions League Top Scorer
 Saša Ćirić (born 1968)
 Slaviša Jokanović (born 1968)
 Vladimir Jugović (born 1969)
 Siniša Mihajlović (born 1969)
 Predrag Mijatović (born 1969)
 Zoran Mirković (born 1971)
 Bobby Despotovski (born 1971)
 Predrag Đorđević (born 1972)
 Darko Kovačević (born 1973)
 Savo Milošević (born 1973)
 Mladen Krstajić (born 1974)
 Ivica Dragutinović (born 1975)
 Saša Ilić (born 1977)
 Veljko Paunović (born 1977)
 Milenko Ačimovič (born 1977), football
 Daniel Majstorović (born 1977), football
 Dejan Stanković (born 1978)
 Marko Nikolić (born 1979)
 Mateja Kežman (born 1979)
 Milivoje Novaković (born 1979), football
 Nikola Žigić (born 1980)
 Nemanja Vidić (born 1981), captain for Manchester United, has collection of honours including 3 consecutive Premier League titles (4 titles in total), the UEFA Champions League, the FIFA World Club Cup, three League Cup medals.
 Aleksandar Luković (born 1982)
 Zvjezdan Misimović (born 1982), football
 Branislav Ivanović (born 1984)
 Miloš Krasić (born 1984)
 Alex Smith (born 1984)
 Aleksandar Kolarov (born 1985)
 Duško Tošić (born 1985)
 Dejan Stankovic (born 1985), beach soccer
 Zdravko Kuzmanović (born 1987)
 Milorad Arsenijević (born 1987)
 Zdravko Kuzmanović (born 1987)
 Nemanja Matić (born 1988)
 Ljubomir Fejsa (born 1988)
 Neven Subotić (born 1988)
 Marko Marin (born 1989), football
 Marko Arnautović (born 1989), football
 Bojan Krkić (born 1990)
 Aleksandar Katai (born 1991)
Danijel Aleksić (born 1991), Serbian footballer, UEFA European Under-17 Championship Golden Player Award
 Filip Mladenović (born 1991)
 Uroš Spajić (born 1993)
 Jovana Damnjanović (born 1994)
 Jelena Čanković (born 1995)
 Sergej Milinković-Savić (born 1995)
 Uroš Račić (born 1998)
 Dušan Vlahović (born 2000)

Handball

 Petar Fajfrić (born 1942), Olympic medalist
 Slobodan Mišković (1944–1997) Olympic medalist
 Zoran Živković (born 1945), Olympic medalist
 Đorđe Lavrnić (1946–2010), Olympic medalist
 Milorad Karalić (born 1946), Olympic medalist
 Branislav Pokrajac (1947–2018) Olympic medalist
 Nebojša Popović (born 1947), Olympic medalist
 Zdravko Rađenović (born 1952), Olympic medalist
 Momir Rnić (born 1955), Olympic medalist
 Zlatan Arnautović (born 1956), Olympic medalist
 Jovica Elezović (born 1956), Olympic medalist
 Milan Kalina (born 1956), Olympic medalist
 Dragan Mladenović (born 1956), Olympic medalist
 Veselin Vuković (born 1958), Olympic medalist
 Mile Isaković (born 1958), Olympic champion
 Svetlana Dašić-Kitić (born 1960), voted the best of all time
 Svetlana Anastasovska (born 1961), Olympic medalist
 Mirjana Đurica (born 1961), Olympic medalist
 Slobodan Kuzmanovski (born 1962), Olympic medalist
 Zlatko Portner (1962–2020) Olympic medalist
 Dragan Škrbić (born 1968), IHF World Player of the Year 2000
 Nedeljko Jovanović (born 1970)
 Vladan Matić (born 1970)
 Nenad Maksić (born 1972)
 Bojana Radulović (born 1973)
 Ljubomir Vranjes (born 1973)
 Tatjana Medved (born 1974)
 Ratko Nikolić (born 1977)
 Darko Stanić (born 1978)
 Dalibor Doder (born 1979), Olympic medalist
 Katarina Bulatović (born 1979), Olympic medalist
 Ana Đokić (born 1979), Olympic medalist
 Bojana Popović (born 1979), Olympic medalist
 Momir Ilić (born 1981)
 Ivan Nikčević (born 1981)
 Rastko Stojković (born 1981)
 Svetlana Ognjenović (born 1981)
 Marko Vujin (born 1984)
 Katarina Tomašević (born 1984)
 Maja Ognjenović (born 1984), volleyball player, Olympic medalist
 Nikola Karabatić (born 1984), French handball player (Serbian mother)
 Rajko Prodanović (born 1986)
 Dragan Travica (born 1986), volleyball, Olympic medalis
 Petar Nenadić (born 1986)
 Andrea Lekić (born 1987)
 Sanja Damnjanović (born 1987)
 Dragana Cvijić (born 1990)

Tennis 

 Jelena Genčić (1936–2013)
 Slobodan Živojinović (born 1963)
 Daniel Nestor (born 1972), Canadian, born in Belgrade
 Nenad Zimonjić (born 1976)
 Dušan Vemic (born 1976)
 Dejan Petrovic (born 1978)
 Jelena Dokić (born 1983), former world No. 4 (19 August 2002), six WTA
 Frank Dancevic (born 1984), plays for Canada
 Janko Tipsarević (born 1984)
 Jelena Janković (born 1985)
 Viktor Troicki (born 1986)
 Novak Djokovic (born 1987)
 Ana Ivanovic (born 1987)
 Igor Sijsling (born 1987), tennis
 Andrea Petković (born 1987), Bosnian Serb, German national, two WTA
 Vesna Dolonc (born 1989)
 Nikola Čačić (born 1990)
 Miloš Raonić (born 1990), Montenegrin Serb and plays for Canada
 Bojana Jovanovski (born 1991)
 Kristina Mladenović (born 1993), French of Serbian parentage
 Olga Danilović (born 2001)

Volleyball

 Ljubomir Travica (born 1954)
 Zoran Gajić (born 1958)
 Slobodan Kovač (born 1967), Olympic medalist
 Vladimir Batez (born 1969), Olympic medalist
 Rajko Jokanović (born 1971), Olympic medalist
 Đorđe Đurić (born 1971), Olympic medalist
 Đula Mešter (born 1972), Olympic medalist
 Vasa Mijić (born 1973), Olympic medalist
 Slobodan Boškan (born 1975), Olympic medalist
 Vesna Čitaković (born 1979)
 Goran Marić (born 1981)
 Bojan Janić (born 1982)
 Jelena Nikolić (born 1982)
 Vlado Petković (born 1983)
 Anja Spasojević (born 1983)
 Ivana Đerisilo (born 1983)
 Nikola Kovačević (born 1983)
 Nikola Rosić (born 1984)
 Suzana Ćebić (born 1984)
 Dragan Stanković (born 1985)
 Brižitka Molnar (born 1985)
 Nataša Krsmanović (born 1985)
 Miloš Nikić (born 1986)
 Marko Podraščanin (born 1987)
 Ana Antonijević (born 1987)
 Saša Starović (born 1988)
 Milena Rašić (born 1990)
 Mihajlo Mitić (born 1990)
 Sanja Malagurski (born 1990)
 Stefana Veljković (born 1990)
 Aleksandar Atanasijević (born 1991)
 Tijana Bošković (born 1997)
 Tijana Malešević (born 1991)
 Uroš Kovačević (born 1993)

Water polo

 Paul Radmilovic (1886–1968), water polo player for Great Britain in the 1912 Olympics in Stockholm
 Mirko Sandić (1942–2006), member of FINA Hall of Fame
 Nenad Manojlović (1954–2014)
 Dragan Andrić (born 1962), 2x Olympic medalist
 Ljubiša Simić (born 1963), boxer
 Igor Milanović (born 1965)
 Goran Rađenović (born 1966), Olympic medalist
 Viktor Jelenić (born 1970), Olympic medalist
 Dejan Udovičić (born 1970)
 Dušan Popović (1970–2011)
 Petar Trbojević (born 1973), Olympic medalist
 Vladimir Vujasinović (born 1973)
 Nikola Kuljača (born 1974), Olympic medalist
 Dejan Savić (born 1975), waterpolo trainer
 Danilo Ikodinović (born 1976)
 Aleksandar Ćirić (born 1977), Olympic medalist
 Slobodan Soro (born 1978), 2x Olympic medalist
 Branko Peković (born 1979), Olympic medalist
 Vanja Udovičić (born 1982)
 Živko Gocić (born 1982)
 Gojko Pijetlović (born 1983), Olympic medalist
 Slobodan Nikić (born 1983), Olympic medalist
 Duško Pijetlović (born 1985), 2x Olympic medalist
 Nikola Rađen (born 1985), 2x Olympic medalist
 Branislav Mitrović (born 1985)
 Milan Aleksić (born 1986), Olympic medalist
 Marko Avramović (born 1986)
 Filip Filipović (born 1987), waterpolo player
 Andrija Prlainović (born 1987)
 Aleksandar Šapić (born 1978), Serbian politician and a retired water polo player, multiple Olympic medalist
 Stefan Mitrović (born 1988), Olympic medalist
 Miloš Ćuk (born 1990)
 Aleksa Šaponjić (born 1992), Olympic medalist
 Dušan Mandić (born 1994), Olympic medalist

Other 

 Giovanni Raicevich (1881–1957), Greco-Roman wrestler (European Champion, 1909)
 Boris Kostić (1887–1963), chess player
 Johnny Miljus (1895–1976), MLB player
 James Trifunov (1903–1993), Serbian-Canadian Olympic medalist in wrestling
 Steve Swetonic (1903–1974), MLB Player
 Ozren Nedeljković (1903–1984), chess player
 Vasilije Tomović (1906–1994), chess player
 Mike Kreevich (1908–1994), MLB player, notable center fielder during the 1930s and 1940s
 Petar Trifunović (1910–1980), chess player
 Steve Sundra (1910–1952), 1939 World Series Champion
 Al Niemiec (1911–1995), player for the Boston Red Sox, Philadelphia Athletics, and Seattle Rainiers
 George Kakasic (1912–1973), chess player
 Emil Verban (1915–1989), MLB player
 Nick Strincevich (1915–2011), MLB player
 Pete Suder (1916–2006), MLB player
 Wally Judnich (1916–1971), MLB player
 Jess Dobernic (1917–1998), MLB player
 Bill Vukovich (1918–1955), Serbian American automobile racing driver
 Babe Martin (1920–2013), MLB player
 Svetozar Gligorić (1923–2012), chess player
 Dragoljub Janošević (1923–1993), chess player
 Ivan Gubijan (1923–2009),  hammer thrower,  Olympic  medalist
 Walt Dropo (1923–2010), MLB player
 Joe Tepsic (1923–2009), MLB Player
 Dragoljub Velimirović (1942–2014), chess player
 Borislav Milić (1925–1986), chess player
 Bronko Lubich (1925–2007), wrestler, referee and trainer
 Rocky Krsnich (1927–2019), MLB player
 Borivoje Vukov (1929–2010), wrestler, World champion
 Aleksandar Matanović (born 1930), chess player
 Mike Krsnich (1931–2011), MLB player
 Milunka Lazarević (1932–2018), chess player
 Borislav Ivkov (born 1933), chess player
 Eli Grba (1934–2019), American League Champion with the New York Yankees
 Branislav Simic (born 1935), Olympic champion in wrestling
 Milan Matulović (1935–2013), chess player
 Dimitrije Bjelica (born 1935), chess player
 Dragoljub Ciric (1935–2014), chess player
 Branislav Simić (born 1935), wrestler, Olympic medalist
 Milan Vukčević (1937–2003), chess player
 Branislav Martinović (1937–2015), Olympic medalist in wrestling
 Predrag Ostojić (1938–1996), chess player
 Alex Andjelic (1940–2021), coach
 Paul Popovich (born 1940), MLB player
 Mickey Lolich (born 1940), MLB Player
 Milan Vukić (born 1942), chess player
 Bill Vukovich II (born 1944), auto racing driver
 Mike Kekich (born 1945), MLB player
 Ljubomir Vračarević (1947–2013), Serbian martial artist and founder of Real Aikido
 John Vukovich (1947–2007), MLB player and coach
 Vera Nikolić (1948–2021), track and field athlete, double European Champion in 800m, former World record holder
 Slavko Obadov (born 1948), Olympic medalist in judo
 Doc Medich (born 1948), MLB player
 Slavko Obadov (born 1948), Olympic medalist
 Ivan Boldirev (born 1949)
 Ljubomir Ljubojević (born 1950), chess player
 Boško Abramović (born 1951), chess player
 Dave Rajsich (born 1951), MLB player
 Nenad Stekić (born 1951), long jumper
 Peter Vuckovich (born 1952), AL Cy Young winner
 Zoran Pančić (born 1953), Olympic medalist in rowing
 Milorad Stanulov (born 1953), Olympic medalist in rowing
 Momir Petkovic (born 1953), Olympic champion in wrestling
 Milorad Stanulov (born 1953), rowing, Olympic medalist
 Radomir Kovačević (1954–2006), Olympic medalist in judo
 Gary Rajsich (born 1954), MLB player
 Radomir Kovačević (1954–2006), Olympic medalist
 Nenad Miloš (born 1955), swimmer
 Predrag Miloš (born 1955), swimmer
 George Vukovich (born 1956), MLB player
 Mirko Puzović (born 1956), Olympic medalist
 Milan Janić (born 1957), sprint canoeist, World champion
 Dan Radakovich (born 1958), sports administrator
 Petar Popović (born 1959), chess player
 Zlatko Kesler (born 1960), Paralympic medalist in table tennis
 Predrag Nikolić (born 1960), chess player
 Mirko Nišović (born 1961), Olympic champion in canoeing
 Branko Damljanović (born 1961), chess player
 Mirko Nišović (born 1961), sprint canoeist 
 Gordana Perkučin (born 1962), Olympic medalist, table tennis player
 Goran Maksimović (born 1963), Olympic champion in sports shooting
 Dragan Perić (born 1964), shot putter
 Miloš Srejović (born 1965), track and field athlete
 Jasna Šekarić (born 1965), multiple Olympic medalist in sports shooting
 Peter Zezel (1965–2009) ice hockey, Canada Soccer Hall of Fame
 Zoran Zorkic (born 1966), golf coach in Texas
 Ilija Lupulesku (born 1967), Olympic medalist in table tennis
 Slobodan Branković (born 1967), track and field athlete
 Dejan Antić (born 1968), chess player
 Peter Popovic (born 1968), ice hockey
 Vladimir Grbić (born 1970), Olympic champion in volleyball, Volleyball Hall of Fame)
 Alisa Marić (born 1970), chess player
 Mirjana Marić (born 1970), chess player
 Adrien Plavsic (born 1970), ice hockey, Olympic medalist
 Snežana Pajkić (born 1970), middle-distance runner
 Jasna Fazlić (born 1970), Olympic medalist, table tennis player
 Nemanja Mirosavljev (born 1970), World championship bronze medalist
 Dragutin Topić (born 1971), track and field athlete, World junior record holder in high jump with 2.37
 Ryan Radmanovich (born 1971), MLB Player and member of Canada Olympic baseball team
 Sasha Lakovic (1971–2017), ice hockey
 Željko Dimitrijević (born 1971), Paralympic medalist in athletics
 Miloš Milošević (born 1972), swimmer
 Borislava Perić (born 1972), table tennis professional
 Stevan Pletikosić (born 1972), sports shooter, Olympic medalist
 Nikola Grbić (born 1973), Olympic champion in volleyball and coach
 Ognjen Filipović (born 1973), sprint canoeist, World champion
 Slobodan Grujić (born 1973)
 Paola Vukojicic (born 1974), field hockey player
 Aleksandra Ivošev (born 1974), Olympic champion in sports shooting
 Igor Miladinović (born 1974), chess player
 Nikola Stojić (born 1974), rowing
 Aleksandar Karakašević (born 1975), table tennis professional
 Ivan Prokić (born 1975)
 Trifun Živanović (born 1975), Serbian-American figure skater
 Mara Kovačević (born 1975)
 Aleksandar Karakašević (born 1975), table tennis player
 Đorđe Višacki (born 1975), rowing
 Lavinia Milosovici (born 1976), Romanian gymnast of Serbian origin, multiple Olympic champion
 Nenad Babović (born 1976), rowing
 Andrija Gerić (born 1977), Olympic champion in volleyball
 Pavle Jovanovic (1977–2020), Serbian-American bobsledder
 Ivan Ivanišević (born 1977), chess player
 Biljana Golić (born 1977), table tennis professional
 Erik Bakich (born 1977), college baseball coach
 Olivera Jevtić (born 1977), long-distance runner
 Vladan Marković (born 1977), swimmer
 Rhonda Rajsich (born 1978), American racquetball player of Serbian origin
 Bora Sibinkić (born 1978), sprint canoer, World champion
 Snežana Pantić (born 1978)
 Miloš Mijalković (born 1978)
 Andrija Zlatić (born 1978), Olympic medalist
 Ivan Miljković (born 1979), one of the most decorated volleyball players in the world
 Dragan Zorić (born 1979), sprint canoeist, World champion
 Milan Đenadić (born 1979), sprint canoeist, World champion
 Miloš Grlica (born 1979), Paralympic medalist in athletics
 Draženko Mitrović (born 1979), Double paralympic medalist in athletics
 Dragan Šolak (born 1980), chess player
 Bojan Vučković (born 1980), chess player
 Ivan Stević (born 1980), road bicycle racer
 Branko Radivojevič (born 1980), ice hockey
 Miloš Tomić (born 1980), rowing
 Jelena Lolović (born 1981)
 Vanja Babić (born 1981)
 Nataša Dušev-Janić (born 1982), Olympic champion in canoeing
 Goran Nedeljković (born 1982), rowing
 Miloš Pavlović (born 1982), auto racing driver
 Nenad Gajic (born 1983), lacrosse player
 Nick Zoricic (1983–2012), Canadian skier
 Nebojša Jovanović (born 1983), road bicycle racer
 Ljilja Drljević (born 1984), chess player
 Dragan Umicevic (born 1984)
 Brian Bogusevic (born 1984), MLB player
 Milorad Čavić (born 1984), Olympic medalist in swimming
 Damir Mikec (born 1984)
 Nada Matić (born 1984), table tennis professional
 Dušan Borković (born 1984), auto racing driver
 Duško Stanojević (born 1984)
 Iva Obradović (born 1984)
 Goran Jagar (born 1984)
 Marko Marjanović (born 1985)
 Jeff Samardzija (born 1985), MLB player
 Antonija Nađ (born 1986), sprint canoer
 Radomir Petković (born 1986)
 Zorana Arunović (born 1986), sports shooter, World Champion
 Nađa Higl (born 1987), swimmer
 Andrea Arsović (born 1987), sports shooter
 Nenad Pagonis (born 1987), kickboxing champion
 Borki Predojević (born 1987), chess player
 Jovan Popović (born 1987), rowing
 Milan Lucic (born 1988), Canadian
 Sara Isaković (born 1988), Olympic medalist in swimming
 Jovana Brakočević (born 1988), volleyball player
 Milanko Petrović (born 1988), biathlete
 Miroslava Najdanovski (born 1988), swimmer
 Aleksandar Maksimović (born 1988)
 Dejan Pajić (born 1989), sprint canoer 
 Marko Novaković (born 1989), sprint canoer, World champion
 Nevena Ignjatović (born 1990)
 Ognjen Stojanović (born 1990), triathlon
 Tatjana Jelača (born 1990), javelin thrower
 Bobana Veličković (1990–2020) 2 times European Champion
 Ivana Maksimović (born 1990), Olympic medalist
 Milica Mandić (born 1991), Olympic champion in taekwondo
 Christian Yelich (born 1991), MLB player
 Đorđe Nešković (born 1991), curler
 Tanja Dragić (born 1991), Paralympic medalist in athletics
 Aleksandar Rakić (born 1992), mixed martial artist
 Darko Stošić (born 1992), mixed martial artist
 Jovana Crnogorac (born 1992), cross-country mountain biker.
 Alex Petrovic (born 1992), ice hockey
 Velimir Stjepanović (born 1993), swimmer
 Nikola Jakšić (born 1997), waterpolo player
 Staša Gejo (born 1997), sport climber
 Tijana Bogdanović (born 1998), Taekwondo practitioner
 Miljana Knežević, sprint canoer 
 Jefimija Đorđević, golfer
 Andrija Đorđević, golfer

Royalty

Monarchs

Princesses

 Jelena Vukanović (after 1109–1146), Queen of Hungary
 Jelisaveta Nemanjić (fl. 1270–1331), Baness of Bosnia
 Princess Milica of Serbia (c. 1335 – 1405)
 Ana-Neda (fl. 1323–1324), Empress of Bulgaria
 Dragana of Serbia (late 14th century), Empress of Bulgaria
 Jelena Balšić (1365/1366–1443), Lady of Zeta; Grand Duchess of Hum
 Helena Dragaš (c. 1372 – 1450), Byzantine empress, mother of emperors John VIII Palaiologos and Constantine XI Palaiologos
 Olivera Lazarević (1372–1444), Princess of Serbia, and sultana (wife of Ottoman sultan Bayezid I)
 Mara Branković (c. 1416 – 1487), Princess of Serbia, and sultana (wife of Ottoman sultan Murad II)
 Kantakuzina Katarina Branković (1418/19–1492), countess of County of Celje
 Mara Branković (c. 1447 – c. 1500), last Queen of Bosnia and Despina of Serbia
 Marija Branković (1466–1495), Princess of Serbia and Marchioness of Montferrat (died 1495)
 Milica Despina of Wallachia (c. 1485 – 1554), Princess of Wallachia, regent in Wallachia in 1521–1522
 Jelena Rareš, princess of Moldavia, regent in 1551–1553
 Ljubica Vukomanović (1788–1843), Princess of Serbia
 Persida Nenadović (1813–1873), Princess of Serbia
 Darinka Kvekić (1838–1892), Princess of Montenegro
 Milena Vukotić (1847–1923), Queen of Montenegro
 Draga Mašin (1864–1903), Queen of Serbia
 Princess Zorka of Montenegro (1864–1890), Queen of Serbia
 Jelena Petrović Njegoš (1873–1952), Queen of Italy

Politicians and diplomats

Politicians 

 Šćepan Mali (c. 1739 – 1773)
 Lazar Arsenijević Batalaka (1793–1869)
 Petar Ičko (1755–1808)
 Jakov Nenadović (1765–1836)
 Miljko Radonjić (1770–1836), FM
 Petar Dobrnjac (1771–1831)
 Petar Nikolajević Moler (1775–1816)
 Toma Vučić-Perišić (1787–1859)
 Dimitrije Davidović (1789–1838)
 Avram Petronijević (1791–1852)
 Jevrem Nenadović (1793–1867)
 Cvetko Rajović (1793–1897), PM
 Tenka Stefanović (1797–1865)
 Aleksa Simić (1800–1872), PM
 Stefan Marković (1804–1864), PM
 Stevan Knićanin (1807–1855)
 Ilija Garašanin (1812–1874), PM
 Stanojlo Petrović (1813–1893)
 Jovan Subotić (1817–1886)
 Nikola Hristić (1818–1911), PM
 Filip Hristić (1819–1905), PM
 Niko Pucić (1820–1893)
 Medo Pucić (1821–1882)
 Jovan Marinović (1821–1893)
 Jovan Ilić (1824–1901)
 Milivoje Petrović Blaznavac (1824–1873)
 Stjepan Mitrov Ljubiša (1824–1878)
 Nikša Gradi (1825–1894) 
 Gavro Vučković Krajišnik (1826–1876)
 Svetozar Miletić (1826–1901)
 Jovan Belimarković (1827–2006)
 Jovan Ristić (1831–1899), PM
 Milan Piroćanac (1837–1937), PM
 Sava Grujić (1840–1913), PM
 Jovan Avakumović (1841–1928), PM
 Ljubomir Kaljević (1841–1907)
 Stojan Novaković (1842–1915), PM
 Đorđe Simić (1843–1912), PM
 Svetomir Nikolajević (1843–1922)
 Nikola Pašić (1845–1926), PM
 Lazar Tomanović (1845–1932), PM
 Mita Rakić (1846–1890)
 Svetozar Marković (1846–1875), Socialist
 Petar Velimirović (1848–1911), PM
 Sava Bjelanović (1850–1897)
 Kosta Hristić (1852–1927)
 Golub Janić (1853–1918)
 Andra Nikolić (1853–1918), FM
 Kosta Taušanović (1854–1902)
 Jaša Tomić (1856–1922)
 Marko Car (1859–1953)
 Ljubomir Davidović (1863–1940), (Democrat)
 Milenko Radomar Vesnić (1863–1921), PM
 Ljubomir Jovanović (1865–1928)
 Dragiša Lapčević (1867–1939)
 Jaša Prodanović (1867–1948)
 Slobodan Jovanović (1869–1958)
 Jovan Ćirković (1871–1928)
 Žika Rafajlović (1871–1953)
 Velimir Vukićević (1871–1930), PM
 Milorad Drašković (1873–1921)
 Nikola Uzunović (1873–1954)
 Đura Dokić (1873–1946)
 Vasa Jovanović (1874–1970)
 Bogdan Radenković (1874–1917)
 Svetozar Pribićević (1875–1936)
 Vojislav Marinković (1876–1935)
 Milan Grol (1876–1952)
 Momčilo Ninčić (1876–1949)
 Josif Kostić (1877–1960)
 Petar Živković (1879–1947), PM
 Milan Srškić (1880–1937)
 Panta Draškić (1881–1957)
 Vasilije Trbić (1881–1962)
 Dimitrije Tucović (1881–1914)
 Aristotel Petrović (1881–1920), mayor of Sarajevo
 Ilija Šumenković (1881–1962) 
 Milan Stojadinović (1881–1960), PM
 Vlada Ilić (1882–1952)
 Dušan Simović (1882–1962), PM
 Dušan A. Popović (1885–1918)
 Svetozar Delić (1885–1967), Communist mayor of Zagreb
 Dragiša Stojadinović (1886–1968)
 Puniša Račić (1886–1944)
 Bogoljub Jevtić (1886–1960)
 Živko Topalović (1886–1972)
 Bogoljub Kujundžić (1887–1949)
 Stevan Moljević (1888–1959)
 Sima Marković (1888–1939), Communist
 Petar Dobrović (1890–1942)
 Tanasije Dinić (1891–1946)
 Božidar Purić (1891–1977)
 Dimitrije Ljotić (1891–1945)
 Dragutin Jovanović-Lune (1892–1932)
 Dragiša Cvetković (1893–1969), PM
 Rodoljub Čolaković (1900–1983), Communist
 Aleksandar Ranković (1900–1983), Communist
 Jovan Veselinov (1906–1982)
 Milovan Đilas (1911–1995)
 Petar Stambolić (1912–2007)
 Milentije Popović (1913–1971), Communist
 Vladimir Dedijer (1914–1990), Communist
 Miloš Minić, (1914–2003), Communist
 Dragoslav Marković (1920–2005)
 Dobrica Ćosić (1921–2014)
 Antonije Isaković (1923–2002)
 Jovan Dejanović (1927–2019)
 Dušan Čkrebić (1927–2022)
 Borisav Jović (1928–2022), former president of Yugoslavia
 Milan Panić (born 1929), PM
 Jovan Rašković (1929–1992)
 Dragoljub Mićunović (born 1930)
 Branislav Crnčević (1933–2011)
 Latinka Perović (born 1933), Communist
 Radmilo Bogdanović (1934–2014)
 George Voinovich (1936–2016)
 Nikola Koljević (1936–1997)
 Ivan Stambolić (1936–2000), Communist
 Mirko Marjanović (1937–2006)
 Trivo Inđić (1938–2020)
 Slobodan Milošević (1941–2006)
 Borislav Paravac (born 1943)
 Vojislav Koštunica (born 1944), PM
 Radovan Karadžić (born 1945)
 Radomir Naumov (1946–2015)
 Veroljub Stevanović (born 1946)
 Vuk Drašković (born 1946), FM
 Miroljub Labus (born 1947)
 Savo Štrbac (born 1949)
 Mirko Cvetković (born 1950), PM
 Velimir Ilić (born 1951)
 Zoran Đinđić (1952–2003), PM
 Tomislav Nikolić (born 1952), President of Serbia
 Oliver Ivanović (1953–2018)
 Bogić Bogićević (born 1953)
 Drago Kovačević (1953–2019)
 Radoman Božović (born 1953), PM
 Nenad Bogdanović (1954–2007), Mayor of Belgrade
 Milan Martić (born 1954)
 Zoran Stanković (born 1954)
 Vojislav Šešelj (born 1954)
 Predrag Marković (born 1955)
 Tomica Milosavljević (born 1955)
 Rod Blagojevich (born 1956)
 Milan Babić (1956–2006)
 Mirko Šarović (born 1956)
 Goran Knežević (born 1957)
 Dragan Čavić (born 1958), President of Republika Srpska
 Nebojša Čović (born 1958)
 Boris Tadić (born 1958), President of Serbia
 Zdravko Krivokapić (born 1958)
 Gordana Čomić (born 1958)
 Milorad Dodik (born 1959), President of Republika Srpska
 Slaviša Ristić (born 1961)
 Đorđe Vukadinović (born 1962), MP
 Zoran Radojičić (born 1963)
 Goran Svilanović (born 1963)
 Dunja Mijatović (born 1964)
 Mlađan Dinkić (born 1964)
 Andrija Mandić (born 1965), leader of Serbs in Montenegro
 Slobodan Vuksanović (born 1965)
 Ivica Dačić (born 1966), PM, FM
 Milan Parivodić (born 1966)
 Claudia Pavlovich Arellano (born 1969), Mexican politician
 Miodrag Linta (born 1969)
 Aleksandar Vučić (born 1970), President of Serbia
 Radovan Ničić (born 1971)
 Siniša Mali (born 1972)
 Aleksandar Vulin (born 1972)
 Vuk Jeremić (born 1975)
 Nikola Selaković (born 1983)
 Draško Stanivuković (born 1993)

Diplomats

 Damjan Ljubibratić (c. 16th–17th century)
 Sava Vladislavich (1669–1738)
 Lazar Teodorović (1771–1846)
 Jeremija Gagić (1783–1859)
 Petar Čardaklija (born 1808)
 Kosta Magazinović (1819–1891)
 Jevrem Grujić (1827–1895)
 Milan Petronijević (1831–1914)
 Milovan Milovanović (1863–1912)
 Ivan Ivanić (1867–1935)
 Mihailo Gavrilović (1868–1924)
 Slavko Grujić (1871–1937)
 Jovan Dučić (1871–1943)
 Boško Čolak-Antić (1871–1949)
 Pavle Beljanski (1892–1965)
 Borisav Jović (born 1928)
 Stanimir Vukićević (born 1948)
 Ivo Visković (born 1949)
 Ivan Mrkić (born 1953)
 Nebojša Rodić (born 1953)
 Dušan T. Bataković (1957–2017), historian and diplomat
 Vladimir Božović (born 1970), historian and diplomat

Military

Homeland and regional 

 Constantine Tikh of Bulgaria (fl. 1257–77), tsar of Bulgaria
 Novak Grebostrek (fl. 1312–14)
 Miloš Obilić (died 1389), knight and national hero
 Ivan Kosančić (died 1389), knight
 Milan Toplica (died 1389), knight
 Péter Petrovics  (c. 1486 – 1557)
 Starina Novak (1530–1601), Hajduk and Moldavian ally
 Vuk Mandušić  (16??–1648), commander in Venetian service, active in the Dalmatian hinterland.
 Janko Mitrović (1613–1659), commander in Venetian service, active in the Dalmatian hinterland.
 Bajo Pivljanin (1630–1685), commander in Venetian service, active in Montenegro and Dalmatia.
 Stojan Janković (1636–1687), commander in Venetian service, active in the Dalmatian hinterland.
 Cvijan Šarić (1652–1668), commander in Venetian service, active in the Dalmatian hinterland.
 Constantin Brancoveanu (1654–1714), Wallachia
 Ilija Perajica (died 1685)
 Stanislav Sočivica (1715–1777), Serbian rebel leader, active in Bosnia and Herzegovina and Montenegro.
 Bogić Vučković (18th century), Serbian rebel leader
 Radič Petrović (1738–1816)
 Aleksa Nenadović (1749–1804)
 Koča Andjelković (1755–1788), Austrian volunteer and Serbian rebel leader.
 Hadži-Prodan Gligorijević (1760–1825), commander in the First Serbian Uprising and volunteer in the Greek War of Independence
 Mladen Milovanović (1760–1823), commander in the First Serbian Uprising
 Karađorđe (1762–1817), leader of the First Serbian Uprising (1804–13)
 Stanoje Glavaš (1763–1815)
 Ilija Birčanin (1764–1804)
 Jakov Nenadović (1765–1836), commander in the First Serbian Uprising
 Vasa Čarapić (1768–1806)
 Stevan Sinđelić (1771–1809), commander in the First Serbian Uprising
 Petar Dobrnjac (1771–1831), commander in the First Serbian Uprising
 Luka Lazarević (1774–1852)
 Čolak-Anta Simeonović (1777–1853), commander in the First Serbian Uprising
 Matija Nenadović (1777–1854), commander in the First Serbian Uprising
 Cincar-Janko (1779–1833)
 Hajduk Veljko Petrović (1780–1813), commander in the First Serbian Uprising
 Uzun-Mirko (1782–1868)
 Arsenije Loma (1785–1815)
 Sima Nenadović (1793–1815), commander in the First Serbian Uprising
 Janko Katić (1795–1806)
 Vasos Mavrovouniotis (1797–1847), volunteer in the Greek War of Independence
 Dimitrije Ljotic (1801–1945)
 Novica Cerović (1805–1895)
 Bogdan Zimonjić (1813–1909)
 Golub Babić (1824–1910), guerrilla chief
 Marko Miljanov (1826–1875), Brda chieftain
 Pecija (1833–1901), Serb hajduk from Bosanska Krajina
 Mićo Ljubibratić (1839–1889), fought in a detachment commanded by Giuseppe Garibaldi
 Evgenije Popović (1842–1943), fought in a detachment commanded by Giuseppe Garibaldi
 Jovan Mišković (1844–1908), commander in the Serbian-Turkish Wars (1876-1878)
 King Peter I of Serbia (1844–1921)
 Rista Cvetković-Božinče (1845–1878)
 General Radomir Putnik (1847–1917)
 Ljubomir Kovačević (1848–1918)
 General Pavle Jurišić Šturm (1848–1922)
 General Jovan Atanacković (1848–1921)
 General Božidar Janković (1849–1920)
 Gavro Vuković (1852–1918)
 General Živojin Mišić (1855–1921)
 General Stepa Stepanović (1856–1929)
 General Vojin Čolak-Antić (1877–1945) 
 General Petar Bojović (1858–1945)
 Aksentije Bacetić (1860–1915)
 Avram Cemović (1864–1914)
 Janko Vukotić (1866–1927)
 Milivoje Stojanović (1873–1914)
 General Milan Nedić (1878–1946)
 Svetozar Ranković-Toza (1880–1914)
 General Vojin Popović (1881–1916), also known as Vojvoda Vuk.
 Major Dragutin Gavrilović (1882–1945)
 General Dušan Simović (1882–1962)
 Blažo Đukanović (1883–1943)
 Mihajlo Petrović (1884–1913), pilot who flew in the Balkan Wars of 1912–1913.
 Dragutin Matić (1888–1970)
 Milunka Savić (1888–1973), war heroine of the 1913 Balkan War and World War I, wounded nine times.
 General Draža Mihailović (1893–1946)
 Petar Leković (1893–1942), soldier for the Serbian Army and Yugoslav Partisans. He was declared the first national hero of Yugoslavia.
 Gavrilo Princip (1894–1918), Bosnian Serb assassin of Archduke Franz Ferdinand of Austria, which triggered the World War I
 Sofija Jovanović (1895–1979), war heroine of the 1913 Balkan War and World War I
 Kosta Mušicki (1897–1946)
 Jezdimir Dangić (1897–1947)
 Sava Kovačević (1905–1943)
 Momčilo Gavrić (1906–1993), the youngest known soldier in the WWI
 Velimir Piletić (1906–1972)
 Momčilo Đujić (1907–1999), Chetnik voivode
 General Koča Popović (1908–1992)
 Boško Buha famous child soldier, grenade thrower
 Milan Spasic (1909–1941), naval hero of WWII
 Major Pavle Đurišić (1909–1945)
 General Kosta Nađ (1911–1986)
 Major Jovan Deroko (1912–1941)
 General Peko Dapčević (1913–1999)
 General Nikola Ljubičić (1916–2005)
 Ilija Monte Radlovic served in the British Army during WWII
 General Veljko Kadijević (1925–2014)
 Nikola Kavaja (1932–2008)
 General Blagoje Adžić (1932–2012)
 General Života Panić (1933–2003)
 General Dragoljub Ojdanić (born 1941)
 General Ratko Mladić (born 1942), army general and chief commander
 General Nebojša Pavković (born 1946)
 General Vladimir Lazarević (born 1949)
 Jovica Stanišić (born 1950), intelligence officer and head of the State Security Service
 General Ljubiša Jokić (born 1958)
 Srđan Aleksić (1966–1993), soldier

Foreign service 

Austria and Hungary
 At the end of the 15th century, Raci warriors came to the Polish Kingdom and played an important role in forming the Polish hussars.
 Mlatišuma (1664–1740), Austrian service, as a part of Serbian Militia (1718–39)
 Jovan Monasterlija (fl. 1683–1706), led Serbian Militia in the name of Leopold I, Holy Roman Emperor against the Turks.
 Jeronim Ljubibratić (1716–1779), Austrian Field marshal
 Arsenije Sečujac (1720–1814), Austrian general
 Adam Bajalics von Bajahaza (1734–1800), Austria-Hungary
 Paul Davidovich (1737–1814), Austria-Hungary
 Paul von Radivojevich (1759–1829), Austrian general
 Karl Paul von Quosdanovich (1763–1817), Austrian general
 Stevan Šupljikac Voivod (Duke) of Serbian Vojvodina (1786–1848), Austria-Hungary
 Janos Damjanich (1804–1849), Hungarian general
 Sebo Vukovics (1811–1872), Hungary
 Petar Preradović (1818–1872), Austrian general
 Jakov Ignjatović (1822–1889), Hungary
 Emanuel Cvjetićanin (1833–1919), Austro-Hungarian Feldmarschalleutnant
 Emil Vojnović (1851–1927), Austrian general and military historian
 Svetozar Boroević (1856–1920), Baron von Bojna, Austro-Hungarian field marshal of Serb origin
 Emil Uzelac (1867–1954), Austro-Hungarian military commander
 Dome Sztojay (1883–1946), Hungary

Ottoman Empire
 Veli Mahmud Pasha (1420–1474), Grand Vizier
 Zagan Pasha (1446–1462/1469), Grand Vizier
 Skenderbeg Crnojević (1457–1528)
 Gedik Ahmed Pasha (died 1482), Grand Vizier 1474–77; Serb from Vranje.
 Deli Husrev Pasha (c. 1495 – 1554), statesman and second Vizier
 Sokollu Mehmed Pasha (1506–1579), Ottoman Grand Vizier
 Hadım Ali Pasha (died 1511), Grand Vizier
 Lala Mustafa Pasha (c. 1500 – 1580),  Grand Vizier
 Telli Hasan Pasha (c. 1530 – 1595), beylerbey
 Semiz Ali Pasha (died 1565), Grand Vizier
 Ferhad Pasha Sokolović (died 1586), Governor of Bosnia
 Boşnak Derviş Mehmed Pasha (c. 1569 – 1606), Grand Vizier
 Yavuz Ali Pasha (died 1604), Ottoman Governor of Egypt from 1601 to 1603
 Sokolluzade Lala Mehmed Pasha (died 1606), Grand Vizier
 Nevesinli Salih Pasha (died 1647), Grand Vizier
 Kara Musa Pasha (died 1649), Grand Vizier
 Sarı Süleyman Pasha (died 1687), Grand Vizier
 Aşub Sultan (died 1690), originally Katarina, consort of Sultan Ibrahim I and mother of Sultan Suleiman II.
 Osman Aga of Temesvar (1670–1725), Ottoman commander
 Şehsuvar Sultan, originally Maria, consort of Sultan Mustafa II (r. 1695–1703) and mother of Sultan Osman III (r. 1754–1757).
 Daltaban Mustafa Pasha (died 1703), Grand Vizier
 Ivaz Mehmed Pasha (died 1743), Grand Vizier
 Sali Aga
 Aganlija  (fl. 1801–1804) 
 Kučuk-Alija (fl. 1801 – 5 August 1804)
 Sinan-paša Sijerčić (died 1806), Ottoman Bosnian general. Bosnian Serb origin.
 Omar Pasha (1806–1871), general, convert
 George Berovich (1845–1897), Governor-General of Crete and Prince of Samos
 Malkoçoğlu family, one of four leading akinci families; Serbian origin

Russian Empire
 John of Tobolsk (1651–1715), in the service of Czar Nicholas II of Russia during the Great War and after
 Sava Lukich Vladislavich Raguzinsky (1664–1738), in the service of Peter the Great
 Jovan Tekelija (1660s–1722)
 Matija Zmajević (1680–1735)
 Simeon Končarević (1690–1769)
 Vuk Isakovič (1696–1759) was Serb military commander in the Austrian-Ottoman Wars.
 Jovan Albanez (f. 1711–1732)
 Ivan Lukačević (fl. 1711–1712)
 Petar Tekelija (1720–1797), General-in-Chief, achieved the highest rank among the Serbs who served in the Imperial Russian Army
 Jovan Horvat (1722–1786)
 Simeon Piščević (1731–1798)
 Semyon Zorich (1743–1799) distinguished himself in the Seven Years' War and the first Russo-Turkish War
 Mark Voynovich (1750–1807), admiral, one of the founders of the Russian Black Sea Fleet, In the service of Imperial Russia
 Ivan Adamovich (1752–1813)
 Jovan Šević (died 1764)
 Nikolay Depreradovich (1767–1843)
 Ilya Duka (1768–1830)
 Mikhail Andreyevich Miloradovich (1771–1825) In the service of Tsar Alexander I during the French invasion of Russia
 Vito Marija Bettera-Vodopić (1771–1841) in the service of Imperial Russia, died as an Austrian prisoner in occupied-Ukraine.
 Georgi Emmanuel (1775–1837)
 Fedor Yakovlevich Mirkovich (1789–1866)
 Mikhail Mirkovich (1836–1891)
 Dejan Subotić (1852–1920)
 Anto Gvozdenović (1853–1935)
 Dmitry Horvat (1858–1937)
 Radola Gajda (1892–1948), in the service of Czar Nicholas II of Russia during the Great War and after
 Aleksa Dundić (1896–1920)
 John of Shanghai and San Francisco (1896–1966), In the service of Czar Nicholas II of Russia during the Great War and after
 Nikolay Gerasimovich Kuznetsov (1904–1974), served during the Great Patriotic War

Others
 Pierre Marinovitch (1898–1914), French World War I flying ace credited with 21 confirmed and 3 probable aerial victories

Religion

Heads of the Serbian Orthodox Church

Patriarchs
 Saint Sava (1174–1236)
 Saint Arsenije I Sremac (1233–1263)
 Saint Sava II (1263–1271)
 Archbishop Danilo I (1271–1272)
 Joanikije I (1272–1276)
 Saint Jevstatije I (1279–1286)
 Saint Jakov (1286–1292)
 Saint Jevstatije II (1292–1309)
 Saint Sava III (1309–1316)
 Saint Nikodim I (1316–1324)
 Saint Danilo II (1324–1337)
 Saint Joanikije II, (1338–1345) and as first Serbian patriarch (1346–1354)
 Patriarch Sava IV (1354–1375)
 Jefrem (1375–1380) and (1389–1390)
 Spiridon (1380–11 August 1389)
 Danilo III (1390–1396)
 Patriarch Raphael I of Constantinople, Patriarch from 1475 to 1476
 Makarije Sokolović (died 1574)
 Patriarch Arsenije III Crnojević (1672–1690)
 Patriarch Kalinik I (1691–1710)
 Patriarch Arsenije IV Jovanović Šakabenta (1726–1737)
 Serbian Patriarch Joanikije III (1739–1746)
 Patriarch Kalinik II (1765–1766)
 Serbian Patriarch Dimitrije (1920–1930)
 Serbian Patriarch Varnava (1930–1937)
 Serbian Patriarch Gavrilo V (1838–1950)
 Serbian Patriarch Vikentije II (1950–1958)
 Serbian Patriarch German (1958–1990)
 Serbian Patriarch Pavle (1990–2009)
 Serbian Patriarch Irinej (2010–2020)
 Serbian Patriarch Porfirije (2021 – present)

Bishops
 Teodor of Vršac (16th century)
 Prince-bishop Danilo I Šćepčev Petrović-Njegoš (1679–1737)
 Prince-bishop Sava II Petrović-Njegoš (1737–1782)
 Prince-bishop Vasilije III Petrović-Njegoš (1744–1766)
 Stefan Stratimirović (1757–1836)
 Prince-bishop Petar I Petrović-Njegoš (Saint Peter of Cetinje), Bishop of Cetinje and Prince-Bishop of Montenegro 1782–1830
 Sava II Branković (1815–1883)
 Ilarion Roganović (1828–1882)
 Prince-bishop Petar II Petrović-Njegoš (1830–1851)
 Mitrofan Ban (1841–1920), Exarch, receiver of the Obilić medal
 Dositej Vasić (1878–1945)
 Nikolaj Velimirović (1880–1956)
 Amfilohije Radović (1938–2020)
 Georgije Đokić (born 1949)
 Longin Krčo (born 1955)
 Mitrofan Kodić (born 1951)
 Joanikije Mićović (born 1959)
 Jovan Ćulibrk (born 1965)
 Jovan Vraniškovski (born 1966)
 Grigorije Durić (born 1966)

Theologians

 Vikentije Ljuština (1761–1805)
 Josif Rajačić (1785–1861)
 Nikodim Milaš (1845–1915)
 Nikolaj Velimirović (1881–1965)
 Justin Popović (1894–1979)
 Saint Varnava Nastić (1914–1964)
 Veselin Kesich (1921–2012)
 Amfilohije Radović (1938–2020)
 Atanasije Jevtić (1938–2021)

Saints and blessed

 Saint Jovan Vladimir (c. 990–2016)
 Saint Lazar of Serbia (1329–1389)
 Osanna of Cattaro (1493–1565), Roman Catholic nun and Saint who converted from Serbian Orthodoxy
 Stefan Stiljanovic (1498–1543)
 Saint Angelina (died 1520), despotess consort of Stephen Branković
 Saint Basil of Ostrog (1610–1671), Bishop of Zahumlje
 Sava II Branković (1615–1683)
 Stephen of Piperi (died 1697)
 Theodor Komogovinski (18th century)
 Avakum (1794–1816)
 Petar Zimonjić (1866–1941)
 Saint Platon of Banja Luka (1874–1941)
 Saint Dionisije Milivojević (1898–1979)
 Saint Slobodan Šiljak (1881–1943)
 Branko Dobrosavljević (1888–1941)
 Saint Đorđe Bogić (1911–1941), parish priest of Našice, was tortured and slain by the Ustasha on the order of a Roman Catholic pries

Other

Business entrepreneurs

 Jovo Kurtović (1718–1809)
 Miša Anastasijević (1803–1885)
 Sima Igumanov (1804–1882)
 Nikola Spasić (1838–1916)
 Luka Ćelović (1854–1929)
 Vladimir Matijević (1854–1929)
 Milan Mandarić (born 1938)
 Miroslav Mišković (born 1945)
 Philip Zepter (born 1950)
 Bogoljub Karić (born 1954)
 Miodrag Kostić (born 1959)

Criminals 

 Pink Panthers, jewel theft network
 Nikola Kavaja, (1932–2008)
 Vojislav Stanimirović (born 1937), organized crime
 Ratko Đokić (1940s–2003)
 Bosko Radonjich (1943–2011)
 Ranko Rubežić (1951–1985)
 Rade Kotur (born 1952)
 Đorđe Božović (1955–1991)
 Dragan "Jokso" Joksović (1956–1998)
 Veselin Vukotić (born 1958)
 Goran Vuković (1959–1994)
 Mille Marković (1961–2014)
 Sreten Jocić (born 1962)
 Zvezdan Jovanović (born 1965), assassinated Serbian PM Zoran Đinđić
 Dušan Spasojević (1968–2003)
 Kristijan Golubović (born 1969), organized crime
 Sretko Kalinić (born 1974)
 Mijailo Mijailović (born 1978), Swedish, assassin of Swedish Foreign Minister Anna Lindh

References

Sources

 
 

 
 
 
 
 

Lists of Serbian people
Lists of people by ethnicity